

16001–16100 

|-bgcolor=#d6d6d6
| 16001 ||  || — || January 15, 1999 || Višnjan Observatory || K. Korlević || HYG || align=right | 7.8 km || 
|-id=002 bgcolor=#fefefe
| 16002 Bertin ||  ||  || January 15, 1999 || Caussols || ODAS || — || align=right | 7.1 km || 
|-id=003 bgcolor=#d6d6d6
| 16003 ||  || — || January 19, 1999 || Oizumi || T. Kobayashi || — || align=right | 6.6 km || 
|-id=004 bgcolor=#fefefe
| 16004 ||  || — || January 20, 1999 || Višnjan Observatory || K. Korlević || FLO || align=right | 3.2 km || 
|-id=005 bgcolor=#E9E9E9
| 16005 ||  || — || January 21, 1999 || Višnjan Observatory || K. Korlević || BAR || align=right | 3.6 km || 
|-id=006 bgcolor=#fefefe
| 16006 ||  || — || January 22, 1999 || Višnjan Observatory || K. Korlević || NYS || align=right | 2.2 km || 
|-id=007 bgcolor=#fefefe
| 16007 Kaasalainen ||  ||  || January 20, 1999 || Caussols || ODAS || — || align=right | 6.3 km || 
|-id=008 bgcolor=#fefefe
| 16008 || 1999 CV || — || February 5, 1999 || Oizumi || T. Kobayashi || FLO || align=right | 2.4 km || 
|-id=009 bgcolor=#E9E9E9
| 16009 ||  || — || February 13, 1999 || Oizumi || T. Kobayashi || MAR || align=right | 10 km || 
|-id=010 bgcolor=#d6d6d6
| 16010 ||  || — || February 13, 1999 || Višnjan Observatory || K. Korlević || EOS || align=right | 9.0 km || 
|-id=011 bgcolor=#E9E9E9
| 16011 ||  || — || February 6, 1999 || Višnjan Observatory || K. Korlević || — || align=right | 4.6 km || 
|-id=012 bgcolor=#fefefe
| 16012 Jamierubin ||  ||  || February 10, 1999 || Socorro || LINEAR || — || align=right | 6.9 km || 
|-id=013 bgcolor=#fefefe
| 16013 Schmidgall ||  ||  || February 10, 1999 || Socorro || LINEAR || — || align=right | 3.5 km || 
|-id=014 bgcolor=#d6d6d6
| 16014 Sinha ||  ||  || February 10, 1999 || Socorro || LINEAR || KOR || align=right | 4.2 km || 
|-id=015 bgcolor=#d6d6d6
| 16015 Snell ||  ||  || February 10, 1999 || Socorro || LINEAR || THM || align=right | 16 km || 
|-id=016 bgcolor=#fefefe
| 16016 ||  || — || February 10, 1999 || Socorro || LINEAR || — || align=right | 3.6 km || 
|-id=017 bgcolor=#E9E9E9
| 16017 Street ||  ||  || February 12, 1999 || Socorro || LINEAR || — || align=right | 5.9 km || 
|-id=018 bgcolor=#E9E9E9
| 16018 ||  || — || February 12, 1999 || Socorro || LINEAR || — || align=right | 21 km || 
|-id=019 bgcolor=#fefefe
| 16019 Edwardsu ||  ||  || February 12, 1999 || Socorro || LINEAR || — || align=right | 5.7 km || 
|-id=020 bgcolor=#fefefe
| 16020 Tevelde ||  ||  || February 12, 1999 || Socorro || LINEAR || FLO || align=right | 2.4 km || 
|-id=021 bgcolor=#fefefe
| 16021 Caseyvaughn ||  ||  || February 12, 1999 || Socorro || LINEAR || V || align=right | 2.6 km || 
|-id=022 bgcolor=#fefefe
| 16022 Wissnergross ||  ||  || February 10, 1999 || Socorro || LINEAR || NYS || align=right | 2.6 km || 
|-id=023 bgcolor=#E9E9E9
| 16023 Alisonyee ||  ||  || February 10, 1999 || Socorro || LINEAR || — || align=right | 3.3 km || 
|-id=024 bgcolor=#E9E9E9
| 16024 ||  || — || February 10, 1999 || Socorro || LINEAR || MAR || align=right | 7.2 km || 
|-id=025 bgcolor=#fefefe
| 16025 ||  || — || February 12, 1999 || Socorro || LINEAR || — || align=right | 4.3 km || 
|-id=026 bgcolor=#fefefe
| 16026 Victoriapidgeon ||  ||  || February 13, 1999 || Socorro || LINEAR || — || align=right | 2.7 km || 
|-id=027 bgcolor=#E9E9E9
| 16027 ||  || — || February 18, 1999 || Haleakala || NEAT || — || align=right | 4.5 km || 
|-id=028 bgcolor=#fefefe
| 16028 ||  || — || February 17, 1999 || Socorro || LINEAR || — || align=right | 5.5 km || 
|-id=029 bgcolor=#d6d6d6
| 16029 ||  || — || February 20, 1999 || Socorro || LINEAR || — || align=right | 21 km || 
|-id=030 bgcolor=#E9E9E9
| 16030 ||  || — || March 19, 1999 || High Point || D. K. Chesney || — || align=right | 6.7 km || 
|-id=031 bgcolor=#d6d6d6
| 16031 ||  || — || March 20, 1999 || King City, Ontario Observatory || R. G. Sandness || THM || align=right | 12 km || 
|-id=032 bgcolor=#d6d6d6
| 16032 ||  || — || March 19, 1999 || Socorro || LINEAR || EOS || align=right | 7.5 km || 
|-id=033 bgcolor=#d6d6d6
| 16033 ||  || — || March 24, 1999 || Višnjan Observatory || K. Korlević || KOR || align=right | 7.7 km || 
|-id=034 bgcolor=#fefefe
| 16034 ||  || — || March 24, 1999 || Socorro || LINEAR || — || align=right | 4.2 km || 
|-id=035 bgcolor=#E9E9E9
| 16035 Sasandford ||  ||  || March 24, 1999 || Anderson Mesa || LONEOS || — || align=right | 22 km || 
|-id=036 bgcolor=#E9E9E9
| 16036 Moroz ||  ||  || April 10, 1999 || Anderson Mesa || LONEOS || — || align=right | 13 km || 
|-id=037 bgcolor=#d6d6d6
| 16037 Sheehan ||  ||  || April 10, 1999 || Anderson Mesa || LONEOS || — || align=right | 14 km || 
|-id=038 bgcolor=#d6d6d6
| 16038 ||  || — || April 15, 1999 || Socorro || LINEAR || — || align=right | 12 km || 
|-id=039 bgcolor=#d6d6d6
| 16039 Zeglin ||  ||  || April 15, 1999 || Socorro || LINEAR || THM || align=right | 12 km || 
|-id=040 bgcolor=#d6d6d6
| 16040 ||  || — || April 15, 1999 || Socorro || LINEAR || EOS || align=right | 7.6 km || 
|-id=041 bgcolor=#d6d6d6
| 16041 ||  || — || April 15, 1999 || Socorro || LINEAR || EOS || align=right | 14 km || 
|-id=042 bgcolor=#E9E9E9
| 16042 ||  || — || April 15, 1999 || Socorro || LINEAR || — || align=right | 11 km || 
|-id=043 bgcolor=#fefefe
| 16043 Yichenzhang ||  ||  || April 6, 1999 || Socorro || LINEAR || — || align=right | 3.6 km || 
|-id=044 bgcolor=#d6d6d6
| 16044 Kurtbachmann ||  ||  || April 6, 1999 || Socorro || LINEAR || KOR || align=right | 4.2 km || 
|-id=045 bgcolor=#d6d6d6
| 16045 ||  || — || April 22, 1999 || Xinglong || SCAP || — || align=right | 14 km || 
|-id=046 bgcolor=#d6d6d6
| 16046 Gregnorman || 1999 JK ||  || May 5, 1999 || Reedy Creek || J. Broughton || — || align=right | 14 km || 
|-id=047 bgcolor=#d6d6d6
| 16047 ||  || — || May 8, 1999 || Catalina || CSS || EOS || align=right | 7.1 km || 
|-id=048 bgcolor=#d6d6d6
| 16048 ||  || — || May 10, 1999 || Socorro || LINEAR || THM || align=right | 9.7 km || 
|-id=049 bgcolor=#d6d6d6
| 16049 ||  || — || May 10, 1999 || Socorro || LINEAR || KOR || align=right | 6.1 km || 
|-id=050 bgcolor=#d6d6d6
| 16050 ||  || — || May 10, 1999 || Socorro || LINEAR || THM || align=right | 12 km || 
|-id=051 bgcolor=#E9E9E9
| 16051 Bernero ||  ||  || May 10, 1999 || Socorro || LINEAR || — || align=right | 8.5 km || 
|-id=052 bgcolor=#E9E9E9
| 16052 ||  || — || May 10, 1999 || Socorro || LINEAR || — || align=right | 7.6 km || 
|-id=053 bgcolor=#d6d6d6
| 16053 Brennan ||  ||  || May 10, 1999 || Socorro || LINEAR || KOR || align=right | 4.2 km || 
|-id=054 bgcolor=#d6d6d6
| 16054 ||  || — || May 10, 1999 || Socorro || LINEAR || — || align=right | 15 km || 
|-id=055 bgcolor=#E9E9E9
| 16055 ||  || — || May 10, 1999 || Socorro || LINEAR || GEF || align=right | 5.2 km || 
|-id=056 bgcolor=#E9E9E9
| 16056 ||  || — || May 6, 1999 || Socorro || LINEAR || — || align=right | 9.1 km || 
|-id=057 bgcolor=#E9E9E9
| 16057 ||  || — || May 6, 1999 || Socorro || LINEAR || ADE || align=right | 13 km || 
|-id=058 bgcolor=#fefefe
| 16058 ||  || — || May 6, 1999 || Socorro || LINEAR || — || align=right | 5.4 km || 
|-id=059 bgcolor=#E9E9E9
| 16059 Marybuda ||  ||  || May 12, 1999 || Socorro || LINEAR || — || align=right | 11 km || 
|-id=060 bgcolor=#d6d6d6
| 16060 ||  || — || May 12, 1999 || Socorro || LINEAR || EOS || align=right | 6.0 km || 
|-id=061 bgcolor=#d6d6d6
| 16061 ||  || — || May 13, 1999 || Socorro || LINEAR || HYG || align=right | 12 km || 
|-id=062 bgcolor=#fefefe
| 16062 Buncher ||  ||  || July 14, 1999 || Socorro || LINEAR || — || align=right | 7.4 km || 
|-id=063 bgcolor=#fefefe
| 16063 ||  || — || July 14, 1999 || Socorro || LINEAR || — || align=right | 3.0 km || 
|-id=064 bgcolor=#FFC2E0
| 16064 Davidharvey ||  ||  || September 5, 1999 || Catalina || CSS || AMO +1kmslow || align=right | 4.1 km || 
|-id=065 bgcolor=#E9E9E9
| 16065 Borel ||  ||  || September 11, 1999 || Prescott || P. G. Comba || — || align=right | 2.7 km || 
|-id=066 bgcolor=#d6d6d6
| 16066 Richardbressler ||  ||  || September 8, 1999 || Catalina || CSS || EOS || align=right | 12 km || 
|-id=067 bgcolor=#d6d6d6
| 16067 ||  || — || September 7, 1999 || Socorro || LINEAR || — || align=right | 10 km || 
|-id=068 bgcolor=#fefefe
| 16068 Citron ||  ||  || September 7, 1999 || Socorro || LINEAR || — || align=right | 3.3 km || 
|-id=069 bgcolor=#E9E9E9
| 16069 Marshafolger ||  ||  || September 7, 1999 || Socorro || LINEAR || — || align=right | 3.0 km || 
|-id=070 bgcolor=#C2FFFF
| 16070 Charops ||  ||  || September 8, 1999 || Socorro || LINEAR || L5 || align=right | 63 km || 
|-id=071 bgcolor=#E9E9E9
| 16071 ||  || — || September 9, 1999 || Socorro || LINEAR || MRX || align=right | 5.3 km || 
|-id=072 bgcolor=#E9E9E9
| 16072 ||  || — || September 9, 1999 || Socorro || LINEAR || — || align=right | 1.8 km || 
|-id=073 bgcolor=#fefefe
| 16073 Gaskin ||  ||  || September 9, 1999 || Socorro || LINEAR || FLO || align=right | 2.1 km || 
|-id=074 bgcolor=#E9E9E9
| 16074 Georgekaplan ||  ||  || September 9, 1999 || Socorro || LINEAR || — || align=right | 3.7 km || 
|-id=075 bgcolor=#fefefe
| 16075 Meglass ||  ||  || September 9, 1999 || Socorro || LINEAR || — || align=right | 3.1 km || 
|-id=076 bgcolor=#E9E9E9
| 16076 Barryhaase ||  ||  || September 9, 1999 || Socorro || LINEAR || — || align=right | 4.7 km || 
|-id=077 bgcolor=#fefefe
| 16077 Arayhamilton ||  ||  || September 9, 1999 || Socorro || LINEAR || — || align=right | 4.1 km || 
|-id=078 bgcolor=#E9E9E9
| 16078 Carolhersh ||  ||  || September 9, 1999 || Socorro || LINEAR || — || align=right | 3.1 km || 
|-id=079 bgcolor=#fefefe
| 16079 Imada ||  ||  || September 9, 1999 || Socorro || LINEAR || — || align=right | 4.6 km || 
|-id=080 bgcolor=#E9E9E9
| 16080 ||  || — || September 9, 1999 || Socorro || LINEAR || — || align=right | 3.7 km || 
|-id=081 bgcolor=#d6d6d6
| 16081 ||  || — || September 30, 1999 || Catalina || CSS || — || align=right | 14 km || 
|-id=082 bgcolor=#E9E9E9
| 16082 ||  || — || October 2, 1999 || Višnjan Observatory || K. Korlević, M. Jurić || RAF || align=right | 3.8 km || 
|-id=083 bgcolor=#fefefe
| 16083 Jorvik ||  ||  || October 12, 1999 || Kleť || J. Tichá, M. Tichý || — || align=right | 2.5 km || 
|-id=084 bgcolor=#fefefe
| 16084 ||  || — || October 12, 1999 || Črni Vrh || Črni Vrh || NYS || align=right | 2.3 km || 
|-id=085 bgcolor=#E9E9E9
| 16085 Laffan ||  ||  || October 3, 1999 || Socorro || LINEAR || — || align=right | 6.2 km || 
|-id=086 bgcolor=#d6d6d6
| 16086 ||  || — || October 2, 1999 || Socorro || LINEAR || THM || align=right | 11 km || 
|-id=087 bgcolor=#E9E9E9
| 16087 ||  || — || October 2, 1999 || Socorro || LINEAR || — || align=right | 4.9 km || 
|-id=088 bgcolor=#fefefe
| 16088 ||  || — || October 4, 1999 || Socorro || LINEAR || — || align=right | 4.6 km || 
|-id=089 bgcolor=#E9E9E9
| 16089 Lamb ||  ||  || October 7, 1999 || Socorro || LINEAR || MIS || align=right | 6.4 km || 
|-id=090 bgcolor=#fefefe
| 16090 Lukaszewski ||  ||  || October 7, 1999 || Socorro || LINEAR || SUL || align=right | 5.4 km || 
|-id=091 bgcolor=#fefefe
| 16091 Malchiodi ||  ||  || October 7, 1999 || Socorro || LINEAR || ERI || align=right | 6.8 km || 
|-id=092 bgcolor=#fefefe
| 16092 ||  || — || October 10, 1999 || Socorro || LINEAR || — || align=right | 3.0 km || 
|-id=093 bgcolor=#d6d6d6
| 16093 ||  || — || October 10, 1999 || Socorro || LINEAR || HYG || align=right | 11 km || 
|-id=094 bgcolor=#fefefe
| 16094 Scottmccord ||  ||  || October 2, 1999 || Socorro || LINEAR || SUL || align=right | 4.6 km || 
|-id=095 bgcolor=#fefefe
| 16095 Lorenball ||  ||  || October 8, 1999 || Catalina || CSS || V || align=right | 2.4 km || 
|-id=096 bgcolor=#E9E9E9
| 16096 ||  || — || October 29, 1999 || Xinglong || SCAP || MIS || align=right | 5.9 km || 
|-id=097 bgcolor=#fefefe
| 16097 ||  || — || October 30, 1999 || Catalina || CSS || NYS || align=right | 2.4 km || 
|-id=098 bgcolor=#E9E9E9
| 16098 ||  || — || November 9, 1999 || Višnjan Observatory || K. Korlević || — || align=right | 4.1 km || 
|-id=099 bgcolor=#C2FFFF
| 16099 ||  || — || November 15, 1999 || Ondřejov || P. Kušnirák, P. Pravec || L4 || align=right | 37 km || 
|-id=100 bgcolor=#fefefe
| 16100 ||  || — || November 3, 1999 || Socorro || LINEAR || — || align=right | 2.2 km || 
|}

16101–16200 

|-bgcolor=#d6d6d6
| 16101 Notskas ||  ||  || November 3, 1999 || Socorro || LINEAR || KOR || align=right | 4.4 km || 
|-id=102 bgcolor=#fefefe
| 16102 Barshannon ||  ||  || November 4, 1999 || Socorro || LINEAR || NYS || align=right | 5.0 km || 
|-id=103 bgcolor=#fefefe
| 16103 Lorsolomon ||  ||  || November 5, 1999 || Socorro || LINEAR || NYS || align=right | 3.0 km || 
|-id=104 bgcolor=#fefefe
| 16104 Stesullivan ||  ||  || November 6, 1999 || Socorro || LINEAR || FLO || align=right | 3.1 km || 
|-id=105 bgcolor=#d6d6d6
| 16105 Marksaunders ||  ||  || November 14, 1999 || Anderson Mesa || LONEOS || EOS || align=right | 8.0 km || 
|-id=106 bgcolor=#fefefe
| 16106 Carmagnola ||  ||  || November 12, 1999 || Anderson Mesa || LONEOS || — || align=right | 6.6 km || 
|-id=107 bgcolor=#E9E9E9
| 16107 Chanmugam ||  ||  || November 27, 1999 || Baton Rouge || W. R. Cooney Jr. || PAD || align=right | 7.1 km || 
|-id=108 bgcolor=#fefefe
| 16108 ||  || — || November 28, 1999 || Oizumi || T. Kobayashi || — || align=right | 3.9 km || 
|-id=109 bgcolor=#fefefe
| 16109 ||  || — || November 28, 1999 || Višnjan Observatory || K. Korlević || FLO || align=right | 3.1 km || 
|-id=110 bgcolor=#fefefe
| 16110 Paganetti ||  ||  || November 28, 1999 || Gnosca || S. Sposetti || FLO || align=right | 3.1 km || 
|-id=111 bgcolor=#fefefe
| 16111 Donstrittmatter ||  ||  || December 4, 1999 || Catalina || CSS || NYS || align=right | 3.5 km || 
|-id=112 bgcolor=#fefefe
| 16112 Vitaris ||  ||  || December 5, 1999 || Socorro || LINEAR || V || align=right | 2.1 km || 
|-id=113 bgcolor=#d6d6d6
| 16113 Ahmed ||  ||  || December 6, 1999 || Socorro || LINEAR || KOR || align=right | 3.7 km || 
|-id=114 bgcolor=#fefefe
| 16114 Alyono ||  ||  || December 6, 1999 || Socorro || LINEAR || NYS || align=right | 3.2 km || 
|-id=115 bgcolor=#d6d6d6
| 16115 ||  || — || December 6, 1999 || Socorro || LINEAR || THM || align=right | 13 km || 
|-id=116 bgcolor=#fefefe
| 16116 Balakrishnan ||  ||  || December 6, 1999 || Socorro || LINEAR || NYS || align=right | 2.6 km || 
|-id=117 bgcolor=#d6d6d6
| 16117 ||  || — || December 6, 1999 || Socorro || LINEAR || — || align=right | 10 km || 
|-id=118 bgcolor=#fefefe
| 16118 Therberens ||  ||  || December 7, 1999 || Socorro || LINEAR || — || align=right | 2.7 km || 
|-id=119 bgcolor=#fefefe
| 16119 Bronner ||  ||  || December 7, 1999 || Socorro || LINEAR || — || align=right | 3.4 km || 
|-id=120 bgcolor=#d6d6d6
| 16120 Burnim ||  ||  || December 7, 1999 || Socorro || LINEAR || MRC || align=right | 6.3 km || 
|-id=121 bgcolor=#fefefe
| 16121 Burrell ||  ||  || December 7, 1999 || Socorro || LINEAR || MAS || align=right | 5.8 km || 
|-id=122 bgcolor=#fefefe
| 16122 Wenyicai ||  ||  || December 7, 1999 || Socorro || LINEAR || — || align=right | 2.1 km || 
|-id=123 bgcolor=#fefefe
| 16123 Jessiecheng ||  ||  || December 7, 1999 || Socorro || LINEAR || NYS || align=right | 3.3 km || 
|-id=124 bgcolor=#fefefe
| 16124 Timdong ||  ||  || December 7, 1999 || Socorro || LINEAR || NYS || align=right | 2.5 km || 
|-id=125 bgcolor=#E9E9E9
| 16125 ||  || — || December 7, 1999 || Socorro || LINEAR || — || align=right | 4.9 km || 
|-id=126 bgcolor=#E9E9E9
| 16126 ||  || — || December 7, 1999 || Socorro || LINEAR || — || align=right | 6.6 km || 
|-id=127 bgcolor=#fefefe
| 16127 Farzan-Kashani ||  ||  || December 7, 1999 || Socorro || LINEAR || — || align=right | 2.0 km || 
|-id=128 bgcolor=#fefefe
| 16128 Kirfrieda ||  ||  || December 7, 1999 || Socorro || LINEAR || MAS || align=right | 2.1 km || 
|-id=129 bgcolor=#fefefe
| 16129 Kevingao ||  ||  || December 7, 1999 || Socorro || LINEAR || FLO || align=right | 2.4 km || 
|-id=130 bgcolor=#fefefe
| 16130 Giovine ||  ||  || December 7, 1999 || Socorro || LINEAR || — || align=right | 4.0 km || 
|-id=131 bgcolor=#d6d6d6
| 16131 Kaganovich ||  ||  || December 7, 1999 || Socorro || LINEAR || KOR || align=right | 3.7 km || 
|-id=132 bgcolor=#fefefe
| 16132 Angelakim ||  ||  || December 7, 1999 || Socorro || LINEAR || NYS || align=right | 9.8 km || 
|-id=133 bgcolor=#d6d6d6
| 16133 ||  || — || December 7, 1999 || Socorro || LINEAR || — || align=right | 26 km || 
|-id=134 bgcolor=#d6d6d6
| 16134 ||  || — || December 7, 1999 || Socorro || LINEAR || — || align=right | 14 km || 
|-id=135 bgcolor=#E9E9E9
| 16135 Ivarsson ||  ||  || December 9, 1999 || Fountain Hills || C. W. Juels || — || align=right | 8.2 km || 
|-id=136 bgcolor=#fefefe
| 16136 ||  || — || December 4, 1999 || Catalina || CSS || — || align=right | 4.4 km || 
|-id=137 bgcolor=#fefefe
| 16137 ||  || — || December 5, 1999 || Catalina || CSS || — || align=right | 2.4 km || 
|-id=138 bgcolor=#E9E9E9
| 16138 ||  || — || December 5, 1999 || Catalina || CSS || GEF || align=right | 5.1 km || 
|-id=139 bgcolor=#d6d6d6
| 16139 ||  || — || December 5, 1999 || Catalina || CSS || — || align=right | 7.3 km || 
|-id=140 bgcolor=#E9E9E9
| 16140 ||  || — || December 7, 1999 || Catalina || CSS || GEF || align=right | 4.9 km || 
|-id=141 bgcolor=#E9E9E9
| 16141 ||  || — || December 7, 1999 || Črni Vrh || Črni Vrh || — || align=right | 4.4 km || 
|-id=142 bgcolor=#FA8072
| 16142 Leung ||  ||  || December 6, 1999 || Socorro || LINEAR || — || align=right | 3.0 km || 
|-id=143 bgcolor=#FA8072
| 16143 ||  || — || December 12, 1999 || Socorro || LINEAR || — || align=right | 4.4 km || 
|-id=144 bgcolor=#d6d6d6
| 16144 Korsten ||  ||  || December 15, 1999 || Fountain Hills || C. W. Juels || EOS || align=right | 8.8 km || 
|-id=145 bgcolor=#E9E9E9
| 16145 ||  || — || December 10, 1999 || Socorro || LINEAR || — || align=right | 8.5 km || 
|-id=146 bgcolor=#E9E9E9
| 16146 ||  || — || December 10, 1999 || Socorro || LINEAR || — || align=right | 5.4 km || 
|-id=147 bgcolor=#fefefe
| 16147 Jeanli ||  ||  || December 10, 1999 || Socorro || LINEAR || — || align=right | 3.3 km || 
|-id=148 bgcolor=#E9E9E9
| 16148 ||  || — || December 12, 1999 || Socorro || LINEAR || GEF || align=right | 5.9 km || 
|-id=149 bgcolor=#d6d6d6
| 16149 ||  || — || December 14, 1999 || Socorro || LINEAR || — || align=right | 8.1 km || 
|-id=150 bgcolor=#E9E9E9
| 16150 Clinch ||  ||  || December 9, 1999 || Anderson Mesa || LONEOS || — || align=right | 4.9 km || 
|-id=151 bgcolor=#E9E9E9
| 16151 ||  || — || December 7, 1999 || Catalina || CSS || ADE || align=right | 10 km || 
|-id=152 bgcolor=#C2FFFF
| 16152 ||  || — || December 30, 1999 || San Marcello || L. Tesi, M. Tombelli || L4 || align=right | 16 km || 
|-id=153 bgcolor=#d6d6d6
| 16153 || 2000 AB || — || January 1, 2000 || Višnjan Observatory || K. Korlević || HYG || align=right | 13 km || 
|-id=154 bgcolor=#d6d6d6
| 16154 Dabramo ||  ||  || January 1, 2000 || San Marcello || A. Boattini, M. Tombelli || — || align=right | 17 km || 
|-id=155 bgcolor=#E9E9E9
| 16155 Buddy ||  ||  || January 3, 2000 || Reedy Creek || J. Broughton || — || align=right | 6.8 km || 
|-id=156 bgcolor=#d6d6d6
| 16156 ||  || — || January 3, 2000 || Socorro || LINEAR || — || align=right | 17 km || 
|-id=157 bgcolor=#E9E9E9
| 16157 Toastmasters ||  ||  || January 5, 2000 || Fountain Hills || C. W. Juels || — || align=right | 6.8 km || 
|-id=158 bgcolor=#E9E9E9
| 16158 Monty ||  ||  || January 5, 2000 || Fountain Hills || C. W. Juels || — || align=right | 5.5 km || 
|-id=159 bgcolor=#d6d6d6
| 16159 ||  || — || January 4, 2000 || Socorro || LINEAR || — || align=right | 15 km || 
|-id=160 bgcolor=#d6d6d6
| 16160 ||  || — || January 4, 2000 || Socorro || LINEAR || — || align=right | 9.4 km || 
|-id=161 bgcolor=#fefefe
| 16161 ||  || — || January 4, 2000 || Socorro || LINEAR || — || align=right | 6.9 km || 
|-id=162 bgcolor=#d6d6d6
| 16162 ||  || — || January 4, 2000 || Socorro || LINEAR || EOS || align=right | 11 km || 
|-id=163 bgcolor=#fefefe
| 16163 Suhanli ||  ||  || January 5, 2000 || Socorro || LINEAR || NYS || align=right | 2.4 km || 
|-id=164 bgcolor=#d6d6d6
| 16164 Yangli ||  ||  || January 5, 2000 || Socorro || LINEAR || — || align=right | 4.4 km || 
|-id=165 bgcolor=#fefefe
| 16165 Licht ||  ||  || January 5, 2000 || Socorro || LINEAR || NYS || align=right | 2.5 km || 
|-id=166 bgcolor=#E9E9E9
| 16166 Jonlii ||  ||  || January 5, 2000 || Socorro || LINEAR || — || align=right | 3.2 km || 
|-id=167 bgcolor=#fefefe
| 16167 Oertli ||  ||  || January 5, 2000 || Socorro || LINEAR || — || align=right | 2.2 km || 
|-id=168 bgcolor=#fefefe
| 16168 Palmen ||  ||  || January 5, 2000 || Socorro || LINEAR || MAS || align=right | 1.8 km || 
|-id=169 bgcolor=#fefefe
| 16169 ||  || — || January 4, 2000 || Socorro || LINEAR || — || align=right | 2.8 km || 
|-id=170 bgcolor=#d6d6d6
| 16170 ||  || — || January 4, 2000 || Socorro || LINEAR || EOS || align=right | 8.6 km || 
|-id=171 bgcolor=#fefefe
| 16171 ||  || — || January 4, 2000 || Socorro || LINEAR || — || align=right | 4.3 km || 
|-id=172 bgcolor=#fefefe
| 16172 ||  || — || January 4, 2000 || Socorro || LINEAR || — || align=right | 4.0 km || 
|-id=173 bgcolor=#fefefe
| 16173 ||  || — || January 4, 2000 || Socorro || LINEAR || — || align=right | 3.9 km || 
|-id=174 bgcolor=#fefefe
| 16174 Parihar ||  ||  || January 5, 2000 || Socorro || LINEAR || FLO || align=right | 2.5 km || 
|-id=175 bgcolor=#E9E9E9
| 16175 Rypatterson ||  ||  || January 5, 2000 || Socorro || LINEAR || — || align=right | 4.1 km || 
|-id=176 bgcolor=#E9E9E9
| 16176 ||  || — || January 5, 2000 || Socorro || LINEAR || GEF || align=right | 6.7 km || 
|-id=177 bgcolor=#fefefe
| 16177 Pelzer ||  ||  || January 5, 2000 || Socorro || LINEAR || — || align=right | 3.9 km || 
|-id=178 bgcolor=#d6d6d6
| 16178 ||  || — || January 5, 2000 || Socorro || LINEAR || THM || align=right | 9.7 km || 
|-id=179 bgcolor=#d6d6d6
| 16179 ||  || — || January 4, 2000 || Socorro || LINEAR || THM || align=right | 11 km || 
|-id=180 bgcolor=#fefefe
| 16180 Rapoport ||  ||  || January 4, 2000 || Socorro || LINEAR || — || align=right | 3.3 km || 
|-id=181 bgcolor=#d6d6d6
| 16181 ||  || — || January 4, 2000 || Socorro || LINEAR || HYG || align=right | 11 km || 
|-id=182 bgcolor=#fefefe
| 16182 ||  || — || January 4, 2000 || Socorro || LINEAR || FLO || align=right | 3.9 km || 
|-id=183 bgcolor=#d6d6d6
| 16183 ||  || — || January 5, 2000 || Socorro || LINEAR || — || align=right | 12 km || 
|-id=184 bgcolor=#E9E9E9
| 16184 ||  || — || January 5, 2000 || Socorro || LINEAR || GEF || align=right | 7.1 km || 
|-id=185 bgcolor=#d6d6d6
| 16185 ||  || — || January 5, 2000 || Socorro || LINEAR || TEL || align=right | 5.6 km || 
|-id=186 bgcolor=#E9E9E9
| 16186 ||  || — || January 5, 2000 || Socorro || LINEAR || EUN || align=right | 5.6 km || 
|-id=187 bgcolor=#FA8072
| 16187 ||  || — || January 5, 2000 || Socorro || LINEAR || EUN || align=right | 6.1 km || 
|-id=188 bgcolor=#E9E9E9
| 16188 ||  || — || January 7, 2000 || Socorro || LINEAR || GEF || align=right | 6.0 km || 
|-id=189 bgcolor=#d6d6d6
| 16189 Riehl ||  ||  || January 8, 2000 || Socorro || LINEAR || — || align=right | 5.1 km || 
|-id=190 bgcolor=#E9E9E9
| 16190 ||  || — || January 8, 2000 || Socorro || LINEAR || MAR || align=right | 4.3 km || 
|-id=191 bgcolor=#fefefe
| 16191 Rubyroe ||  ||  || January 10, 2000 || Oaxaca || J. M. Roe || — || align=right | 2.4 km || 
|-id=192 bgcolor=#fefefe
| 16192 Laird ||  ||  || January 4, 2000 || Kitt Peak || Spacewatch || — || align=right | 2.3 km || 
|-id=193 bgcolor=#E9E9E9
| 16193 Nickaiser ||  ||  || January 4, 2000 || Kitt Peak || Spacewatch || HEN || align=right | 3.6 km || 
|-id=194 bgcolor=#d6d6d6
| 16194 Roderick ||  ||  || January 4, 2000 || Anderson Mesa || LONEOS || — || align=right | 19 km || 
|-id=195 bgcolor=#d6d6d6
| 16195 ||  || — || January 5, 2000 || Socorro || LINEAR || URS || align=right | 12 km || 
|-id=196 bgcolor=#d6d6d6
| 16196 ||  || — || January 5, 2000 || Socorro || LINEAR || — || align=right | 9.4 km || 
|-id=197 bgcolor=#fefefe
| 16197 Bluepeter ||  ||  || January 7, 2000 || Anderson Mesa || LONEOS || — || align=right | 4.2 km || 
|-id=198 bgcolor=#E9E9E9
| 16198 Búzios ||  ||  || January 7, 2000 || Anderson Mesa || LONEOS || — || align=right | 5.4 km || 
|-id=199 bgcolor=#d6d6d6
| 16199 Rozenblyum ||  ||  || January 30, 2000 || Socorro || LINEAR || KOR || align=right | 3.7 km || 
|-id=200 bgcolor=#d6d6d6
| 16200 ||  || — || January 30, 2000 || Socorro || LINEAR || — || align=right | 13 km || 
|}

16201–16300 

|-bgcolor=#fefefe
| 16201 ||  || — || February 4, 2000 || Višnjan Observatory || K. Korlević || EUT || align=right | 3.2 km || 
|-id=202 bgcolor=#fefefe
| 16202 Srivastava ||  ||  || February 2, 2000 || Socorro || LINEAR || NYS || align=right | 7.1 km || 
|-id=203 bgcolor=#E9E9E9
| 16203 Jessicastahl ||  ||  || February 2, 2000 || Socorro || LINEAR || — || align=right | 3.5 km || 
|-id=204 bgcolor=#d6d6d6
| 16204 ||  || — || February 4, 2000 || Višnjan Observatory || K. Korlević || — || align=right | 4.6 km || 
|-id=205 bgcolor=#fefefe
| 16205 ||  || — || February 4, 2000 || Višnjan Observatory || K. Korlević || — || align=right | 2.7 km || 
|-id=206 bgcolor=#E9E9E9
| 16206 ||  || — || February 4, 2000 || Socorro || LINEAR || — || align=right | 6.4 km || 
|-id=207 bgcolor=#d6d6d6
| 16207 Montgomery ||  ||  || February 1, 2000 || Catalina || CSS || EOS || align=right | 6.9 km || 
|-id=208 bgcolor=#d6d6d6
| 16208 ||  || — || February 2, 2000 || Socorro || LINEAR || — || align=right | 12 km || 
|-id=209 bgcolor=#fefefe
| 16209 Sterner ||  ||  || February 4, 2000 || Socorro || LINEAR || MAS || align=right | 2.4 km || 
|-id=210 bgcolor=#d6d6d6
| 16210 ||  || — || February 2, 2000 || Socorro || LINEAR || — || align=right | 7.1 km || 
|-id=211 bgcolor=#fefefe
| 16211 Samirsur ||  ||  || February 4, 2000 || Socorro || LINEAR || — || align=right | 2.4 km || 
|-id=212 bgcolor=#fefefe
| 16212 Theberge ||  ||  || February 4, 2000 || Socorro || LINEAR || — || align=right | 3.1 km || 
|-id=213 bgcolor=#d6d6d6
| 16213 ||  || — || February 4, 2000 || Socorro || LINEAR || — || align=right | 20 km || 
|-id=214 bgcolor=#fefefe
| 16214 Venkatachalam ||  ||  || February 4, 2000 || Socorro || LINEAR || V || align=right | 3.3 km || 
|-id=215 bgcolor=#fefefe
| 16215 Venkatraman ||  ||  || February 11, 2000 || Socorro || LINEAR || — || align=right | 1.8 km || 
|-id=216 bgcolor=#E9E9E9
| 16216 ||  || — || February 28, 2000 || Socorro || LINEAR || — || align=right | 15 km || 
|-id=217 bgcolor=#E9E9E9
| 16217 Peterbroughton ||  ||  || February 28, 2000 || Kitt Peak || Spacewatch || — || align=right | 2.7 km || 
|-id=218 bgcolor=#d6d6d6
| 16218 Mintakeyes ||  ||  || February 26, 2000 || Catalina || CSS || — || align=right | 10 km || 
|-id=219 bgcolor=#fefefe
| 16219 Venturelli ||  ||  || February 29, 2000 || Socorro || LINEAR || — || align=right | 1.5 km || 
|-id=220 bgcolor=#E9E9E9
| 16220 Mikewagner ||  ||  || February 29, 2000 || Socorro || LINEAR || — || align=right | 4.0 km || 
|-id=221 bgcolor=#fefefe
| 16221 Kevinyang ||  ||  || February 29, 2000 || Socorro || LINEAR || — || align=right | 2.3 km || 
|-id=222 bgcolor=#fefefe
| 16222 Donnanderson ||  ||  || February 29, 2000 || Socorro || LINEAR || — || align=right | 1.9 km || 
|-id=223 bgcolor=#d6d6d6
| 16223 ||  || — || February 29, 2000 || Socorro || LINEAR || KOR || align=right | 5.0 km || 
|-id=224 bgcolor=#d6d6d6
| 16224 ||  || — || February 29, 2000 || Socorro || LINEAR || — || align=right | 5.2 km || 
|-id=225 bgcolor=#E9E9E9
| 16225 Georgebaldo ||  ||  || February 29, 2000 || Socorro || LINEAR || — || align=right | 2.7 km || 
|-id=226 bgcolor=#d6d6d6
| 16226 Beaton ||  ||  || February 29, 2000 || Socorro || LINEAR || — || align=right | 8.2 km || 
|-id=227 bgcolor=#d6d6d6
| 16227 ||  || — || February 29, 2000 || Socorro || LINEAR || KOR || align=right | 5.7 km || 
|-id=228 bgcolor=#d6d6d6
| 16228 ||  || — || March 8, 2000 || Socorro || LINEAR || THM || align=right | 10 km || 
|-id=229 bgcolor=#d6d6d6
| 16229 ||  || — || March 9, 2000 || Socorro || LINEAR || THM || align=right | 9.8 km || 
|-id=230 bgcolor=#E9E9E9
| 16230 Benson ||  ||  || March 9, 2000 || Socorro || LINEAR || — || align=right | 4.4 km || 
|-id=231 bgcolor=#d6d6d6
| 16231 Jessberger ||  ||  || March 11, 2000 || Anderson Mesa || LONEOS || THMslow || align=right | 9.0 km || 
|-id=232 bgcolor=#d6d6d6
| 16232 Chijagerbs ||  ||  || March 6, 2000 || Haleakala || NEAT || HIL3:2 || align=right | 15 km || 
|-id=233 bgcolor=#E9E9E9
| 16233 ||  || — || March 31, 2000 || Socorro || LINEAR || MAR || align=right | 7.2 km || 
|-id=234 bgcolor=#fefefe
| 16234 Bosse ||  ||  || March 29, 2000 || Socorro || LINEAR || V || align=right | 3.0 km || 
|-id=235 bgcolor=#E9E9E9
| 16235 ||  || — || March 29, 2000 || Socorro || LINEAR || DOR || align=right | 12 km || 
|-id=236 bgcolor=#E9E9E9
| 16236 Stebrehmer ||  ||  || April 5, 2000 || Socorro || LINEAR || — || align=right | 4.7 km || 
|-id=237 bgcolor=#E9E9E9
| 16237 ||  || — || April 5, 2000 || Socorro || LINEAR || — || align=right | 5.2 km || 
|-id=238 bgcolor=#fefefe
| 16238 Chappe ||  ||  || April 7, 2000 || Socorro || LINEAR || NYS || align=right | 2.7 km || 
|-id=239 bgcolor=#E9E9E9
| 16239 Dower ||  ||  || April 7, 2000 || Socorro || LINEAR || — || align=right | 2.5 km || 
|-id=240 bgcolor=#d6d6d6
| 16240 ||  || — || April 8, 2000 || Socorro || LINEAR || slow || align=right | 12 km || 
|-id=241 bgcolor=#E9E9E9
| 16241 Dvorsky ||  ||  || April 7, 2000 || Socorro || LINEAR || — || align=right | 4.1 km || 
|-id=242 bgcolor=#fefefe
| 16242 ||  || — || April 7, 2000 || Socorro || LINEAR || — || align=right | 9.2 km || 
|-id=243 bgcolor=#d6d6d6
| 16243 Rosenbauer ||  ||  || April 4, 2000 || Anderson Mesa || LONEOS || — || align=right | 14 km || 
|-id=244 bgcolor=#fefefe
| 16244 Brož ||  ||  || April 4, 2000 || Anderson Mesa || LONEOS || — || align=right | 3.0 km || 
|-id=245 bgcolor=#d6d6d6
| 16245 ||  || — || April 7, 2000 || Socorro || LINEAR || HYG || align=right | 7.3 km || 
|-id=246 bgcolor=#d6d6d6
| 16246 Cantor ||  ||  || April 27, 2000 || Prescott || P. G. Comba || THM || align=right | 7.2 km || 
|-id=247 bgcolor=#d6d6d6
| 16247 Esner ||  ||  || April 28, 2000 || Socorro || LINEAR || KOR || align=right | 3.4 km || 
|-id=248 bgcolor=#fefefe
| 16248 Fox ||  ||  || April 28, 2000 || Socorro || LINEAR || NYS || align=right | 4.3 km || 
|-id=249 bgcolor=#d6d6d6
| 16249 Cauchy ||  ||  || April 29, 2000 || Prescott || P. G. Comba || KOR || align=right | 3.5 km || 
|-id=250 bgcolor=#fefefe
| 16250 Delbó ||  ||  || April 26, 2000 || Anderson Mesa || LONEOS || V || align=right | 2.3 km || 
|-id=251 bgcolor=#fefefe
| 16251 Barbifrank ||  ||  || April 29, 2000 || Socorro || LINEAR || NYS || align=right | 1.9 km || 
|-id=252 bgcolor=#fefefe
| 16252 Franfrost ||  ||  || April 29, 2000 || Socorro || LINEAR || NYS || align=right | 4.4 km || 
|-id=253 bgcolor=#d6d6d6
| 16253 Griffis ||  ||  || April 29, 2000 || Socorro || LINEAR || — || align=right | 5.0 km || 
|-id=254 bgcolor=#d6d6d6
| 16254 Harper ||  ||  || April 29, 2000 || Socorro || LINEAR || KOR || align=right | 4.1 km || 
|-id=255 bgcolor=#d6d6d6
| 16255 Hampton ||  ||  || April 26, 2000 || Anderson Mesa || LONEOS || KOR || align=right | 4.6 km || 
|-id=256 bgcolor=#fefefe
| 16256 ||  || — || May 3, 2000 || Socorro || LINEAR || H || align=right | 2.0 km || 
|-id=257 bgcolor=#E9E9E9
| 16257 ||  || — || May 4, 2000 || Socorro || LINEAR || — || align=right | 18 km || 
|-id=258 bgcolor=#fefefe
| 16258 Willhayes ||  ||  || May 6, 2000 || Socorro || LINEAR || — || align=right | 4.1 km || 
|-id=259 bgcolor=#E9E9E9
| 16259 Housinger ||  ||  || May 6, 2000 || Socorro || LINEAR || — || align=right | 8.9 km || 
|-id=260 bgcolor=#fefefe
| 16260 Sputnik ||  ||  || May 9, 2000 || Reedy Creek || J. Broughton || — || align=right | 5.0 km || 
|-id=261 bgcolor=#d6d6d6
| 16261 Iidemachi ||  ||  || May 4, 2000 || Nanyo || T. Okuni || — || align=right | 8.3 km || 
|-id=262 bgcolor=#d6d6d6
| 16262 Rikurtz ||  ||  || May 7, 2000 || Socorro || LINEAR || — || align=right | 4.3 km || 
|-id=263 bgcolor=#d6d6d6
| 16263 ||  || — || May 7, 2000 || Socorro || LINEAR || THM || align=right | 7.2 km || 
|-id=264 bgcolor=#E9E9E9
| 16264 Richlee ||  ||  || May 7, 2000 || Socorro || LINEAR || — || align=right | 4.5 km || 
|-id=265 bgcolor=#d6d6d6
| 16265 Lemay ||  ||  || May 7, 2000 || Socorro || LINEAR || THM || align=right | 8.8 km || 
|-id=266 bgcolor=#d6d6d6
| 16266 Johconnell ||  ||  || May 7, 2000 || Socorro || LINEAR || BRA || align=right | 5.7 km || 
|-id=267 bgcolor=#d6d6d6
| 16267 Mcdermott ||  ||  || May 7, 2000 || Socorro || LINEAR || — || align=right | 3.9 km || 
|-id=268 bgcolor=#fefefe
| 16268 Mcneeley ||  ||  || May 7, 2000 || Socorro || LINEAR || NYS || align=right | 1.9 km || 
|-id=269 bgcolor=#d6d6d6
| 16269 Merkord ||  ||  || May 7, 2000 || Socorro || LINEAR || THM || align=right | 7.1 km || 
|-id=270 bgcolor=#E9E9E9
| 16270 ||  || — || May 9, 2000 || Socorro || LINEAR || — || align=right | 7.3 km || 
|-id=271 bgcolor=#fefefe
| 16271 Duanenichols ||  ||  || May 6, 2000 || Socorro || LINEAR || — || align=right | 3.1 km || 
|-id=272 bgcolor=#d6d6d6
| 16272 ||  || — || May 6, 2000 || Socorro || LINEAR || MEL || align=right | 16 km || 
|-id=273 bgcolor=#fefefe
| 16273 Oneill ||  ||  || May 6, 2000 || Socorro || LINEAR || — || align=right | 4.8 km || 
|-id=274 bgcolor=#fefefe
| 16274 Pavlica ||  ||  || May 6, 2000 || Socorro || LINEAR || V || align=right | 2.6 km || 
|-id=275 bgcolor=#E9E9E9
| 16275 ||  || — || May 6, 2000 || Socorro || LINEAR || — || align=right | 7.0 km || 
|-id=276 bgcolor=#E9E9E9
| 16276 ||  || — || May 7, 2000 || Socorro || LINEAR || slow || align=right | 7.2 km || 
|-id=277 bgcolor=#E9E9E9
| 16277 Mallada ||  ||  || May 4, 2000 || Kitt Peak || Spacewatch || — || align=right | 13 km || 
|-id=278 bgcolor=#d6d6d6
| 16278 ||  || — || May 7, 2000 || Socorro || LINEAR || THM || align=right | 11 km || 
|-id=279 bgcolor=#d6d6d6
| 16279 ||  || — || May 28, 2000 || Socorro || LINEAR || THM || align=right | 12 km || 
|-id=280 bgcolor=#fefefe
| 16280 Groussin ||  ||  || June 1, 2000 || Anderson Mesa || LONEOS || — || align=right | 3.1 km || 
|-id=281 bgcolor=#E9E9E9
| 16281 || 2071 P-L || — || September 24, 1960 || Palomar || PLS || — || align=right | 3.4 km || 
|-id=282 bgcolor=#E9E9E9
| 16282 || 2512 P-L || — || September 24, 1960 || Palomar || PLS || — || align=right | 4.9 km || 
|-id=283 bgcolor=#E9E9E9
| 16283 || 2545 P-L || — || September 24, 1960 || Palomar || PLS || GEF || align=right | 3.8 km || 
|-id=284 bgcolor=#d6d6d6
| 16284 || 2861 P-L || — || September 24, 1960 || Palomar || PLS || — || align=right | 6.3 km || 
|-id=285 bgcolor=#d6d6d6
| 16285 || 3047 P-L || — || September 24, 1960 || Palomar || PLS || INA || align=right | 12 km || 
|-id=286 bgcolor=#d6d6d6
| 16286 || 4057 P-L || — || September 24, 1960 || Palomar || PLS || CHA || align=right | 4.4 km || 
|-id=287 bgcolor=#d6d6d6
| 16287 || 4096 P-L || — || September 24, 1960 || Palomar || PLS || — || align=right | 7.6 km || 
|-id=288 bgcolor=#E9E9E9
| 16288 || 4169 P-L || — || September 24, 1960 || Palomar || PLS || — || align=right | 6.0 km || 
|-id=289 bgcolor=#E9E9E9
| 16289 || 4201 P-L || — || September 24, 1960 || Palomar || PLS || — || align=right | 5.9 km || 
|-id=290 bgcolor=#d6d6d6
| 16290 || 4204 P-L || — || September 24, 1960 || Palomar || PLS || — || align=right | 4.7 km || 
|-id=291 bgcolor=#d6d6d6
| 16291 || 4315 P-L || — || September 24, 1960 || Palomar || PLS || KOR || align=right | 3.9 km || 
|-id=292 bgcolor=#fefefe
| 16292 || 4557 P-L || — || September 24, 1960 || Palomar || PLS || — || align=right | 1.7 km || 
|-id=293 bgcolor=#E9E9E9
| 16293 || 4613 P-L || — || September 24, 1960 || Palomar || PLS || — || align=right | 2.2 km || 
|-id=294 bgcolor=#d6d6d6
| 16294 || 4758 P-L || — || September 24, 1960 || Palomar || PLS || HYG || align=right | 5.4 km || 
|-id=295 bgcolor=#d6d6d6
| 16295 || 4820 P-L || — || September 24, 1960 || Palomar || PLS || — || align=right | 5.1 km || 
|-id=296 bgcolor=#E9E9E9
| 16296 || 6308 P-L || — || September 24, 1960 || Palomar || PLS || — || align=right | 3.0 km || 
|-id=297 bgcolor=#E9E9E9
| 16297 || 6346 P-L || — || September 24, 1960 || Palomar || PLS || — || align=right | 9.5 km || 
|-id=298 bgcolor=#d6d6d6
| 16298 || 6529 P-L || — || September 24, 1960 || Palomar || PLS || THM || align=right | 6.7 km || 
|-id=299 bgcolor=#E9E9E9
| 16299 || 6566 P-L || — || September 24, 1960 || Palomar || PLS || — || align=right | 3.3 km || 
|-id=300 bgcolor=#d6d6d6
| 16300 || 6569 P-L || — || September 24, 1960 || Palomar || PLS || THM || align=right | 10 km || 
|}

16301–16400 

|-bgcolor=#fefefe
| 16301 || 6576 P-L || — || September 24, 1960 || Palomar || PLS || FLO || align=right | 3.4 km || 
|-id=302 bgcolor=#d6d6d6
| 16302 || 6634 P-L || — || September 24, 1960 || Palomar || PLS || — || align=right | 8.5 km || 
|-id=303 bgcolor=#d6d6d6
| 16303 || 6639 P-L || — || September 24, 1960 || Palomar || PLS || THM || align=right | 6.6 km || 
|-id=304 bgcolor=#fefefe
| 16304 || 6704 P-L || — || September 24, 1960 || Palomar || PLS || EUT || align=right | 2.0 km || 
|-id=305 bgcolor=#d6d6d6
| 16305 || 6707 P-L || — || September 24, 1960 || Palomar || PLS || — || align=right | 6.2 km || 
|-id=306 bgcolor=#fefefe
| 16306 || 6797 P-L || — || September 24, 1960 || Palomar || PLS || MAS || align=right | 2.9 km || 
|-id=307 bgcolor=#fefefe
| 16307 || 7569 P-L || — || October 17, 1960 || Palomar || PLS || — || align=right | 2.2 km || 
|-id=308 bgcolor=#E9E9E9
| 16308 || 7627 P-L || — || October 22, 1960 || Palomar || PLS || — || align=right | 3.0 km || 
|-id=309 bgcolor=#E9E9E9
| 16309 || 9054 P-L || — || October 17, 1960 || Palomar || PLS || — || align=right | 4.3 km || 
|-id=310 bgcolor=#fefefe
| 16310 || 1043 T-1 || — || March 25, 1971 || Palomar || PLS || — || align=right | 2.4 km || 
|-id=311 bgcolor=#fefefe
| 16311 || 1102 T-1 || — || March 25, 1971 || Palomar || PLS || V || align=right | 2.3 km || 
|-id=312 bgcolor=#E9E9E9
| 16312 || 1122 T-1 || — || March 25, 1971 || Palomar || PLS || — || align=right | 9.0 km || 
|-id=313 bgcolor=#d6d6d6
| 16313 || 1199 T-1 || — || March 25, 1971 || Palomar || PLS || KOR || align=right | 4.5 km || 
|-id=314 bgcolor=#d6d6d6
| 16314 || 1248 T-1 || — || March 25, 1971 || Palomar || PLS || HYG || align=right | 11 km || 
|-id=315 bgcolor=#E9E9E9
| 16315 || 2055 T-1 || — || March 25, 1971 || Palomar || PLS || GER || align=right | 5.4 km || 
|-id=316 bgcolor=#d6d6d6
| 16316 || 2089 T-1 || — || March 25, 1971 || Palomar || PLS || THM || align=right | 9.4 km || 
|-id=317 bgcolor=#fefefe
| 16317 || 2127 T-1 || — || March 25, 1971 || Palomar || PLS || — || align=right | 3.6 km || 
|-id=318 bgcolor=#fefefe
| 16318 || 2128 T-1 || — || March 25, 1971 || Palomar || PLS || — || align=right | 4.8 km || 
|-id=319 bgcolor=#fefefe
| 16319 Xiamenerzhong || 3252 T-1 ||  || March 26, 1971 || Palomar || PLS || — || align=right | 2.4 km || 
|-id=320 bgcolor=#fefefe
| 16320 || 4078 T-1 || — || March 26, 1971 || Palomar || PLS || FLO || align=right | 2.2 km || 
|-id=321 bgcolor=#fefefe
| 16321 || 4225 T-1 || — || March 26, 1971 || Palomar || PLS || — || align=right | 2.9 km || 
|-id=322 bgcolor=#fefefe
| 16322 || 4409 T-1 || — || March 26, 1971 || Palomar || PLS || — || align=right | 2.5 km || 
|-id=323 bgcolor=#E9E9E9
| 16323 || 1107 T-2 || — || September 29, 1973 || Palomar || PLS || — || align=right | 7.7 km || 
|-id=324 bgcolor=#d6d6d6
| 16324 || 1181 T-2 || — || September 29, 1973 || Palomar || PLS || — || align=right | 4.5 km || 
|-id=325 bgcolor=#d6d6d6
| 16325 || 1332 T-2 || — || September 29, 1973 || Palomar || PLS || — || align=right | 5.2 km || 
|-id=326 bgcolor=#d6d6d6
| 16326 || 2052 T-2 || — || September 29, 1973 || Palomar || PLS || KOR || align=right | 5.6 km || 
|-id=327 bgcolor=#E9E9E9
| 16327 || 3092 T-2 || — || September 30, 1973 || Palomar || PLS || — || align=right | 3.8 km || 
|-id=328 bgcolor=#E9E9E9
| 16328 || 3111 T-2 || — || September 30, 1973 || Palomar || PLS || EUN || align=right | 3.9 km || 
|-id=329 bgcolor=#E9E9E9
| 16329 || 3255 T-2 || — || September 30, 1973 || Palomar || PLS || — || align=right | 4.9 km || 
|-id=330 bgcolor=#E9E9E9
| 16330 || 3276 T-2 || — || September 30, 1973 || Palomar || PLS || — || align=right | 3.2 km || 
|-id=331 bgcolor=#d6d6d6
| 16331 || 4101 T-2 || — || September 29, 1973 || Palomar || PLS || — || align=right | 12 km || 
|-id=332 bgcolor=#d6d6d6
| 16332 || 4117 T-2 || — || September 29, 1973 || Palomar || PLS || THM || align=right | 14 km || 
|-id=333 bgcolor=#E9E9E9
| 16333 || 4122 T-2 || — || September 29, 1973 || Palomar || PLS || — || align=right | 7.0 km || 
|-id=334 bgcolor=#E9E9E9
| 16334 || 4278 T-2 || — || September 29, 1973 || Palomar || PLS || — || align=right | 2.5 km || 
|-id=335 bgcolor=#E9E9E9
| 16335 || 5058 T-2 || — || September 25, 1973 || Palomar || PLS || — || align=right | 9.4 km || 
|-id=336 bgcolor=#fefefe
| 16336 || 5080 T-2 || — || September 25, 1973 || Palomar || PLS || — || align=right | 2.2 km || 
|-id=337 bgcolor=#d6d6d6
| 16337 || 5087 T-2 || — || September 25, 1973 || Palomar || PLS || EOS || align=right | 7.9 km || 
|-id=338 bgcolor=#fefefe
| 16338 || 1106 T-3 || — || October 17, 1977 || Palomar || PLS || — || align=right | 5.5 km || 
|-id=339 bgcolor=#d6d6d6
| 16339 || 2053 T-3 || — || October 16, 1977 || Palomar || PLS || HYG || align=right | 7.0 km || 
|-id=340 bgcolor=#E9E9E9
| 16340 || 2110 T-3 || — || October 16, 1977 || Palomar || PLS || — || align=right | 3.8 km || 
|-id=341 bgcolor=#fefefe
| 16341 || 2182 T-3 || — || October 16, 1977 || Palomar || PLS || — || align=right | 2.8 km || 
|-id=342 bgcolor=#d6d6d6
| 16342 || 2271 T-3 || — || October 16, 1977 || Palomar || PLS || — || align=right | 5.0 km || 
|-id=343 bgcolor=#E9E9E9
| 16343 || 2326 T-3 || — || October 16, 1977 || Palomar || PLS || — || align=right | 3.0 km || 
|-id=344 bgcolor=#E9E9E9
| 16344 || 2370 T-3 || — || October 16, 1977 || Palomar || PLS || GEF || align=right | 4.1 km || 
|-id=345 bgcolor=#d6d6d6
| 16345 || 2391 T-3 || — || October 16, 1977 || Palomar || PLS || KOR || align=right | 3.7 km || 
|-id=346 bgcolor=#d6d6d6
| 16346 || 2682 T-3 || — || October 11, 1977 || Palomar || PLS || — || align=right | 15 km || 
|-id=347 bgcolor=#d6d6d6
| 16347 || 3256 T-3 || — || October 16, 1977 || Palomar || PLS || — || align=right | 5.9 km || 
|-id=348 bgcolor=#d6d6d6
| 16348 || 3465 T-3 || — || October 16, 1977 || Palomar || PLS || — || align=right | 6.1 km || 
|-id=349 bgcolor=#E9E9E9
| 16349 || 4062 T-3 || — || October 16, 1977 || Palomar || PLS || — || align=right | 3.8 km || 
|-id=350 bgcolor=#d6d6d6
| 16350 ||  || — || November 11, 1964 || Nanking || Purple Mountain Obs. || — || align=right | 8.7 km || 
|-id=351 bgcolor=#fefefe
| 16351 || 1971 US || — || October 26, 1971 || Hamburg-Bergedorf || L. Kohoutek || — || align=right | 5.7 km || 
|-id=352 bgcolor=#fefefe
| 16352 || 1974 FF || — || March 22, 1974 || Cerro El Roble || C. Torres || — || align=right | 3.6 km || 
|-id=353 bgcolor=#E9E9E9
| 16353 || 1974 WB || — || November 16, 1974 || Harvard Observatory || Harvard Obs. || slow || align=right | 6.9 km || 
|-id=354 bgcolor=#d6d6d6
| 16354 ||  || — || September 30, 1975 || Palomar || S. J. Bus || — || align=right | 5.1 km || 
|-id=355 bgcolor=#E9E9E9
| 16355 Buber ||  ||  || October 29, 1975 || Tautenburg Observatory || F. Börngen || — || align=right | 2.8 km || 
|-id=356 bgcolor=#d6d6d6
| 16356 Univbalttech ||  ||  || April 1, 1976 || Nauchnij || N. S. Chernykh || THM || align=right | 15 km || 
|-id=357 bgcolor=#fefefe
| 16357 Risanpei ||  ||  || October 22, 1976 || Kiso || H. Kosai, K. Furukawa || FLO || align=right | 2.0 km || 
|-id=358 bgcolor=#E9E9E9
| 16358 Plesetsk ||  ||  || December 20, 1976 || Nauchnij || N. S. Chernykh || EUN || align=right | 7.2 km || 
|-id=359 bgcolor=#fefefe
| 16359 ||  || — || November 7, 1978 || Palomar || E. F. Helin, S. J. Bus || NYS || align=right | 7.5 km || 
|-id=360 bgcolor=#fefefe
| 16360 ||  || — || November 7, 1978 || Palomar || E. F. Helin, S. J. Bus || — || align=right | 2.7 km || 
|-id=361 bgcolor=#d6d6d6
| 16361 ||  || — || June 25, 1979 || Siding Spring || E. F. Helin, S. J. Bus || — || align=right | 5.1 km || 
|-id=362 bgcolor=#E9E9E9
| 16362 ||  || — || June 25, 1979 || Siding Spring || E. F. Helin, S. J. Bus || ADE || align=right | 7.4 km || 
|-id=363 bgcolor=#E9E9E9
| 16363 ||  || — || June 25, 1979 || Siding Spring || E. F. Helin, S. J. Bus || — || align=right | 5.4 km || 
|-id=364 bgcolor=#d6d6d6
| 16364 ||  || — || June 25, 1979 || Siding Spring || E. F. Helin, S. J. Bus || — || align=right | 6.9 km || 
|-id=365 bgcolor=#E9E9E9
| 16365 ||  || — || June 25, 1979 || Siding Spring || E. F. Helin, S. J. Bus || — || align=right | 3.6 km || 
|-id=366 bgcolor=#E9E9E9
| 16366 ||  || — || June 25, 1979 || Siding Spring || E. F. Helin, S. J. Bus || EUN || align=right | 5.6 km || 
|-id=367 bgcolor=#d6d6d6
| 16367 Astronomiasvecia ||  ||  || March 16, 1980 || La Silla || C.-I. Lagerkvist || SAN || align=right | 5.9 km || 
|-id=368 bgcolor=#d6d6d6
| 16368 Città di Alba || 1981 DF ||  || February 28, 1981 || La Silla || H. Debehogne, G. DeSanctis || — || align=right | 17 km || 
|-id=369 bgcolor=#d6d6d6
| 16369 || 1981 DJ || — || February 28, 1981 || Siding Spring || S. J. Bus || — || align=right | 11 km || 
|-id=370 bgcolor=#d6d6d6
| 16370 ||  || — || February 28, 1981 || Siding Spring || S. J. Bus || — || align=right | 5.7 km || 
|-id=371 bgcolor=#E9E9E9
| 16371 ||  || — || February 28, 1981 || Siding Spring || S. J. Bus || ADE || align=right | 8.6 km || 
|-id=372 bgcolor=#d6d6d6
| 16372 Demichele ||  ||  || March 7, 1981 || La Silla || H. Debehogne, G. DeSanctis || — || align=right | 7.8 km || 
|-id=373 bgcolor=#E9E9E9
| 16373 ||  || — || March 7, 1981 || Siding Spring || S. J. Bus || — || align=right | 7.1 km || 
|-id=374 bgcolor=#d6d6d6
| 16374 ||  || — || March 1, 1981 || Siding Spring || S. J. Bus || URS || align=right | 9.4 km || 
|-id=375 bgcolor=#d6d6d6
| 16375 ||  || — || March 1, 1981 || Siding Spring || S. J. Bus || VER || align=right | 12 km || 
|-id=376 bgcolor=#E9E9E9
| 16376 ||  || — || March 1, 1981 || Siding Spring || S. J. Bus || — || align=right | 6.0 km || 
|-id=377 bgcolor=#fefefe
| 16377 ||  || — || March 7, 1981 || Siding Spring || S. J. Bus || FLO || align=right | 2.7 km || 
|-id=378 bgcolor=#E9E9E9
| 16378 ||  || — || March 2, 1981 || Siding Spring || S. J. Bus || — || align=right | 4.8 km || 
|-id=379 bgcolor=#d6d6d6
| 16379 ||  || — || March 2, 1981 || Siding Spring || S. J. Bus || HYG || align=right | 9.3 km || 
|-id=380 bgcolor=#E9E9E9
| 16380 ||  || — || March 2, 1981 || Siding Spring || S. J. Bus || — || align=right | 7.1 km || 
|-id=381 bgcolor=#E9E9E9
| 16381 ||  || — || March 2, 1981 || Siding Spring || S. J. Bus || — || align=right | 6.0 km || 
|-id=382 bgcolor=#fefefe
| 16382 ||  || — || March 2, 1981 || Siding Spring || S. J. Bus || V || align=right | 2.3 km || 
|-id=383 bgcolor=#E9E9E9
| 16383 ||  || — || March 2, 1981 || Siding Spring || S. J. Bus || — || align=right | 5.1 km || 
|-id=384 bgcolor=#d6d6d6
| 16384 ||  || — || March 2, 1981 || Siding Spring || S. J. Bus || — || align=right | 9.0 km || 
|-id=385 bgcolor=#E9E9E9
| 16385 ||  || — || March 7, 1981 || Siding Spring || S. J. Bus || — || align=right | 5.1 km || 
|-id=386 bgcolor=#E9E9E9
| 16386 ||  || — || March 2, 1981 || Siding Spring || S. J. Bus || MIT || align=right | 7.3 km || 
|-id=387 bgcolor=#E9E9E9
| 16387 ||  || — || March 11, 1981 || Siding Spring || S. J. Bus || — || align=right | 5.8 km || 
|-id=388 bgcolor=#fefefe
| 16388 ||  || — || March 2, 1981 || Siding Spring || S. J. Bus || NYS || align=right | 1.6 km || 
|-id=389 bgcolor=#d6d6d6
| 16389 ||  || — || March 2, 1981 || Siding Spring || S. J. Bus || — || align=right | 3.8 km || 
|-id=390 bgcolor=#d6d6d6
| 16390 ||  || — || March 2, 1981 || Siding Spring || S. J. Bus || HYG || align=right | 7.4 km || 
|-id=391 bgcolor=#E9E9E9
| 16391 ||  || — || March 2, 1981 || Siding Spring || S. J. Bus || HEN || align=right | 3.0 km || 
|-id=392 bgcolor=#E9E9E9
| 16392 ||  || — || March 2, 1981 || Siding Spring || S. J. Bus || — || align=right | 3.0 km || 
|-id=393 bgcolor=#fefefe
| 16393 || 1981 QS || — || August 24, 1981 || Kleť || L. Brožek || — || align=right | 3.6 km || 
|-id=394 bgcolor=#E9E9E9
| 16394 ||  || — || August 30, 1981 || Palomar || S. J. Bus || — || align=right | 7.0 km || 
|-id=395 bgcolor=#fefefe
| 16395 Ioannpravednyj ||  ||  || October 23, 1981 || Nauchnij || L. I. Chernykh || — || align=right | 9.2 km || 
|-id=396 bgcolor=#fefefe
| 16396 ||  || — || October 24, 1981 || Palomar || S. J. Bus || — || align=right | 2.6 km || 
|-id=397 bgcolor=#fefefe
| 16397 ||  || — || May 15, 1982 || Palomar || E. F. Helin, E. M. Shoemaker || FLO || align=right | 2.6 km || 
|-id=398 bgcolor=#fefefe
| 16398 Hummel ||  ||  || September 24, 1982 || Tautenburg Observatory || F. Börngen || NYS || align=right | 3.6 km || 
|-id=399 bgcolor=#E9E9E9
| 16399 Grokhovsky ||  ||  || September 14, 1983 || Anderson Mesa || E. Bowell || — || align=right | 7.7 km || 
|-id=400 bgcolor=#fefefe
| 16400 ||  || — || September 27, 1984 || Kleť || Z. Vávrová || — || align=right | 3.8 km || 
|}

16401–16500 

|-bgcolor=#d6d6d6
| 16401 ||  || — || September 21, 1984 || La Silla || H. Debehogne || — || align=right | 7.7 km || 
|-id=402 bgcolor=#fefefe
| 16402 Olgapopova || 1984 UR ||  || October 26, 1984 || Anderson Mesa || E. Bowell || — || align=right | 5.9 km || 
|-id=403 bgcolor=#fefefe
| 16403 ||  || — || November 20, 1984 || Caussols || C. Pollas || — || align=right | 4.1 km || 
|-id=404 bgcolor=#fefefe
| 16404 ||  || — || February 13, 1985 || La Silla || H. Debehogne || FLO || align=right | 3.3 km || 
|-id=405 bgcolor=#fefefe
| 16405 ||  || — || February 20, 1985 || La Silla || H. Debehogne || — || align=right | 4.2 km || 
|-id=406 bgcolor=#E9E9E9
| 16406 Oszkiewicz || 1985 PH ||  || August 14, 1985 || Anderson Mesa || E. Bowell || — || align=right | 4.8 km || 
|-id=407 bgcolor=#fefefe
| 16407 Oiunskij ||  ||  || September 19, 1985 || Nauchnij || N. S. Chernykh, L. I. Chernykh || — || align=right | 3.9 km || 
|-id=408 bgcolor=#E9E9E9
| 16408 || 1986 AB || — || January 11, 1986 || Toyota || K. Suzuki, T. Urata || — || align=right | 14 km || 
|-id=409 bgcolor=#fefefe
| 16409 ||  || — || February 12, 1986 || La Silla || H. Debehogne || — || align=right | 3.7 km || 
|-id=410 bgcolor=#E9E9E9
| 16410 ||  || — || August 28, 1986 || La Silla || H. Debehogne || — || align=right | 11 km || 
|-id=411 bgcolor=#E9E9E9
| 16411 ||  || — || August 28, 1986 || La Silla || H. Debehogne || — || align=right | 6.8 km || 
|-id=412 bgcolor=#E9E9E9
| 16412 || 1986 WZ || — || November 25, 1986 || Kleť || Z. Vávrová || — || align=right | 7.0 km || 
|-id=413 bgcolor=#d6d6d6
| 16413 Abulghazi ||  ||  || January 28, 1987 || La Silla || E. W. Elst || — || align=right | 11 km || 
|-id=414 bgcolor=#fefefe
| 16414 Le Procope ||  ||  || August 25, 1987 || La Silla || E. W. Elst || FLO || align=right | 2.7 km || 
|-id=415 bgcolor=#E9E9E9
| 16415 ||  || — || August 21, 1987 || Zimmerwald || P. Wild || ADE || align=right | 11 km || 
|-id=416 bgcolor=#fefefe
| 16416 ||  || — || September 25, 1987 || Brorfelde || P. Jensen || — || align=right | 3.4 km || 
|-id=417 bgcolor=#fefefe
| 16417 ||  || — || September 30, 1987 || Brorfelde || P. Jensen || — || align=right | 2.0 km || 
|-id=418 bgcolor=#fefefe
| 16418 Lortzing ||  ||  || September 29, 1987 || Tautenburg Observatory || F. Börngen || — || align=right | 4.7 km || 
|-id=419 bgcolor=#fefefe
| 16419 Kovalev ||  ||  || September 24, 1987 || Nauchnij || L. V. Zhuravleva || — || align=right | 3.3 km || 
|-id=420 bgcolor=#E9E9E9
| 16420 ||  || — || October 28, 1987 || Kushiro || S. Ueda, H. Kaneda || EUN || align=right | 4.2 km || 
|-id=421 bgcolor=#fefefe
| 16421 Roadrunner || 1988 BJ ||  || January 22, 1988 || Haute Provence || E. W. Elst || Hslow || align=right | 3.3 km || 
|-id=422 bgcolor=#fefefe
| 16422 ||  || — || January 18, 1988 || La Silla || H. Debehogne || FLO || align=right | 2.6 km || 
|-id=423 bgcolor=#fefefe
| 16423 ||  || — || January 19, 1988 || La Silla || H. Debehogne || FLO || align=right | 4.2 km || 
|-id=424 bgcolor=#fefefe
| 16424 Davaine ||  ||  || February 11, 1988 || La Silla || E. W. Elst || — || align=right | 2.5 km || 
|-id=425 bgcolor=#fefefe
| 16425 Chuckyeager ||  ||  || February 11, 1988 || La Silla || E. W. Elst || — || align=right | 3.1 km || 
|-id=426 bgcolor=#fefefe
| 16426 || 1988 EC || — || March 7, 1988 || Gekko || Y. Oshima || H || align=right | 2.8 km || 
|-id=427 bgcolor=#fefefe
| 16427 ||  || — || March 13, 1988 || Brorfelde || P. Jensen || — || align=right | 4.3 km || 
|-id=428 bgcolor=#C2FFFF
| 16428 ||  || — || September 14, 1988 || Cerro Tololo || S. J. Bus || L5 || align=right | 22 km || 
|-id=429 bgcolor=#fefefe
| 16429 ||  || — || September 16, 1988 || Cerro Tololo || S. J. Bus || — || align=right | 3.9 km || 
|-id=430 bgcolor=#E9E9E9
| 16430 ||  || — || November 3, 1988 || Brorfelde || P. Jensen || EUN || align=right | 4.9 km || 
|-id=431 bgcolor=#E9E9E9
| 16431 ||  || — || November 6, 1988 || Yorii || M. Arai, H. Mori || — || align=right | 3.5 km || 
|-id=432 bgcolor=#fefefe
| 16432 ||  || — || November 10, 1988 || Yorii || M. Arai, H. Mori || — || align=right | 3.6 km || 
|-id=433 bgcolor=#d6d6d6
| 16433 ||  || — || November 8, 1988 || Kushiro || S. Ueda, H. Kaneda || — || align=right | 16 km || 
|-id=434 bgcolor=#E9E9E9
| 16434 ||  || — || November 11, 1988 || Gekko || Y. Oshima || — || align=right | 3.2 km || 
|-id=435 bgcolor=#E9E9E9
| 16435 Fándly ||  ||  || November 7, 1988 || Piwnice || M. Antal || — || align=right | 4.9 km || 
|-id=436 bgcolor=#fefefe
| 16436 || 1988 XL || — || December 3, 1988 || Gekko || Y. Oshima || — || align=right | 4.0 km || 
|-id=437 bgcolor=#E9E9E9
| 16437 ||  || — || December 7, 1988 || Harvard Observatory || Oak Ridge Observatory || EUN || align=right | 4.4 km || 
|-id=438 bgcolor=#E9E9E9
| 16438 Knöfel ||  ||  || January 11, 1989 || Tautenburg Observatory || F. Börngen || PAD || align=right | 11 km || 
|-id=439 bgcolor=#E9E9E9
| 16439 Yamehoshinokawa || 1989 BZ ||  || January 30, 1989 || Kitami || T. Fujii, K. Watanabe || EUN || align=right | 7.5 km || 
|-id=440 bgcolor=#fefefe
| 16440 ||  || — || March 2, 1989 || Siding Spring || R. H. McNaught || FLO || align=right | 2.8 km || 
|-id=441 bgcolor=#E9E9E9
| 16441 Kirchner ||  ||  || March 7, 1989 || Tautenburg Observatory || F. Börngen || — || align=right | 10 km || 
|-id=442 bgcolor=#E9E9E9
| 16442 ||  || — || April 3, 1989 || La Silla || E. W. Elst || — || align=right | 4.9 km || 
|-id=443 bgcolor=#fefefe
| 16443 ||  || — || April 3, 1989 || La Silla || E. W. Elst || FLO || align=right | 3.1 km || 
|-id=444 bgcolor=#fefefe
| 16444 Godefroy ||  ||  || April 3, 1989 || La Silla || E. W. Elst || FLO || align=right | 3.3 km || 
|-id=445 bgcolor=#d6d6d6
| 16445 Klimt ||  ||  || April 3, 1989 || La Silla || E. W. Elst || — || align=right | 20 km || 
|-id=446 bgcolor=#d6d6d6
| 16446 || 1989 MH || — || June 29, 1989 || Palomar || E. F. Helin || — || align=right | 11 km || 
|-id=447 bgcolor=#E9E9E9
| 16447 Vauban || 1989 RX ||  || September 3, 1989 || Haute Provence || E. W. Elst || — || align=right | 13 km || 
|-id=448 bgcolor=#fefefe
| 16448 ||  || — || September 7, 1989 || Kleť || A. Mrkos || FLO || align=right | 3.0 km || 
|-id=449 bgcolor=#d6d6d6
| 16449 Kigoyama || 1989 SO ||  || September 29, 1989 || Kitami || T. Fujii, K. Watanabe || HYG || align=right | 16 km || 
|-id=450 bgcolor=#d6d6d6
| 16450 Messerschmidt ||  ||  || September 26, 1989 || La Silla || E. W. Elst || HYG || align=right | 14 km || 
|-id=451 bgcolor=#fefefe
| 16451 ||  || — || September 26, 1989 || La Silla || E. W. Elst || — || align=right | 3.0 km || 
|-id=452 bgcolor=#fefefe
| 16452 Goldfinger ||  ||  || September 28, 1989 || Palomar || C. S. Shoemaker, E. M. Shoemaker || V || align=right | 4.5 km || 
|-id=453 bgcolor=#E9E9E9
| 16453 ||  || — || September 23, 1989 || La Silla || H. Debehogne || EUN || align=right | 5.9 km || 
|-id=454 bgcolor=#d6d6d6
| 16454 ||  || — || October 3, 1989 || Cerro Tololo || S. J. Bus || HYG || align=right | 16 km || 
|-id=455 bgcolor=#fefefe
| 16455 ||  || — || October 4, 1989 || La Silla || H. Debehogne || NYS || align=right | 3.4 km || 
|-id=456 bgcolor=#fefefe
| 16456 || 1989 UO || — || October 23, 1989 || Kani || Y. Mizuno, T. Furuta || NYS || align=right | 3.0 km || 
|-id=457 bgcolor=#d6d6d6
| 16457 || 1989 VF || — || November 2, 1989 || Kushiro || S. Ueda, H. Kaneda || EOS || align=right | 11 km || 
|-id=458 bgcolor=#d6d6d6
| 16458 ||  || — || November 21, 1989 || Gekko || Y. Oshima || — || align=right | 13 km || 
|-id=459 bgcolor=#fefefe
| 16459 Barth ||  ||  || November 28, 1989 || Tautenburg Observatory || F. Börngen || NYS || align=right | 3.0 km || 
|-id=460 bgcolor=#E9E9E9
| 16460 ||  || — || December 30, 1989 || Siding Spring || R. H. McNaught || — || align=right | 4.1 km || 
|-id=461 bgcolor=#d6d6d6
| 16461 || 1990 BO || — || January 21, 1990 || Kushiro || S. Ueda, H. Kaneda || — || align=right | 28 km || 
|-id=462 bgcolor=#fefefe
| 16462 ||  || — || February 24, 1990 || La Silla || H. Debehogne || V || align=right | 4.4 km || 
|-id=463 bgcolor=#E9E9E9
| 16463 Nayoro || 1990 EK ||  || March 2, 1990 || Kitami || K. Endate, K. Watanabe || — || align=right | 5.3 km || 
|-id=464 bgcolor=#fefefe
| 16464 ||  || — || March 2, 1990 || La Silla || E. W. Elst || — || align=right | 8.1 km || 
|-id=465 bgcolor=#FA8072
| 16465 Basilrowe ||  ||  || March 24, 1990 || Palomar || J. E. Mueller || H || align=right | 2.1 km || 
|-id=466 bgcolor=#E9E9E9
| 16466 Piyashiriyama ||  ||  || March 29, 1990 || Kitami || K. Endate, K. Watanabe || EUN || align=right | 10 km || 
|-id=467 bgcolor=#d6d6d6
| 16467 ||  || — || March 16, 1990 || La Silla || H. Debehogne || — || align=right | 22 km || 
|-id=468 bgcolor=#E9E9E9
| 16468 ||  || — || April 27, 1990 || Siding Spring || R. H. McNaught || MAR || align=right | 5.0 km || 
|-id=469 bgcolor=#E9E9E9
| 16469 || 1990 KR || — || May 21, 1990 || Palomar || E. F. Helin || — || align=right | 3.5 km || 
|-id=470 bgcolor=#fefefe
| 16470 ||  || — || July 29, 1990 || Palomar || H. E. Holt || FLO || align=right | 3.2 km || 
|-id=471 bgcolor=#fefefe
| 16471 ||  || — || July 27, 1990 || Palomar || H. E. Holt || — || align=right | 3.8 km || 
|-id=472 bgcolor=#E9E9E9
| 16472 ||  || — || July 27, 1990 || Palomar || H. E. Holt || DOR || align=right | 12 km || 
|-id=473 bgcolor=#d6d6d6
| 16473 ||  || — || August 22, 1990 || Palomar || H. E. Holt || KOR || align=right | 5.9 km || 
|-id=474 bgcolor=#FA8072
| 16474 ||  || — || August 28, 1990 || Palomar || H. E. Holt || — || align=right | 1.4 km || 
|-id=475 bgcolor=#fefefe
| 16475 ||  || — || August 24, 1990 || Palomar || H. E. Holt || — || align=right | 4.4 km || 
|-id=476 bgcolor=#fefefe
| 16476 ||  || — || August 24, 1990 || Palomar || H. E. Holt || FLO || align=right | 3.6 km || 
|-id=477 bgcolor=#fefefe
| 16477 ||  || — || August 25, 1990 || Palomar || H. E. Holt || — || align=right | 3.1 km || 
|-id=478 bgcolor=#fefefe
| 16478 ||  || — || August 20, 1990 || La Silla || E. W. Elst || — || align=right | 2.5 km || 
|-id=479 bgcolor=#d6d6d6
| 16479 Paulze ||  ||  || August 20, 1990 || La Silla || E. W. Elst || EOS || align=right | 6.2 km || 
|-id=480 bgcolor=#fefefe
| 16480 ||  || — || August 20, 1990 || La Silla || E. W. Elst || NYS || align=right | 2.9 km || 
|-id=481 bgcolor=#d6d6d6
| 16481 Thames ||  ||  || August 16, 1990 || La Silla || E. W. Elst || — || align=right | 13 km || 
|-id=482 bgcolor=#d6d6d6
| 16482 ||  || — || August 16, 1990 || La Silla || E. W. Elst || — || align=right | 4.7 km || 
|-id=483 bgcolor=#d6d6d6
| 16483 ||  || — || August 16, 1990 || La Silla || E. W. Elst || KOR || align=right | 5.1 km || 
|-id=484 bgcolor=#d6d6d6
| 16484 ||  || — || August 16, 1990 || La Silla || E. W. Elst || KOR || align=right | 5.3 km || 
|-id=485 bgcolor=#d6d6d6
| 16485 ||  || — || September 14, 1990 || Palomar || H. E. Holt || LIX || align=right | 14 km || 
|-id=486 bgcolor=#fefefe
| 16486 ||  || — || September 14, 1990 || Palomar || H. E. Holt || FLO || align=right | 5.2 km || 
|-id=487 bgcolor=#fefefe
| 16487 ||  || — || September 8, 1990 || La Silla || H. Debehogne || FLO || align=right | 3.1 km || 
|-id=488 bgcolor=#fefefe
| 16488 ||  || — || September 13, 1990 || Palomar || H. E. Holt || FLO || align=right | 2.8 km || 
|-id=489 bgcolor=#d6d6d6
| 16489 || 1990 SG || — || September 17, 1990 || Siding Spring || R. H. McNaught || — || align=right | 16 km || 
|-id=490 bgcolor=#fefefe
| 16490 ||  || — || September 18, 1990 || Palomar || H. E. Holt || — || align=right | 2.7 km || 
|-id=491 bgcolor=#fefefe
| 16491 ||  || — || September 18, 1990 || Palomar || H. E. Holt || FLO || align=right | 3.3 km || 
|-id=492 bgcolor=#fefefe
| 16492 ||  || — || September 22, 1990 || La Silla || E. W. Elst || — || align=right | 6.9 km || 
|-id=493 bgcolor=#d6d6d6
| 16493 ||  || — || September 22, 1990 || La Silla || E. W. Elst || KOR || align=right | 4.6 km || 
|-id=494 bgcolor=#d6d6d6
| 16494 Oka ||  ||  || September 22, 1990 || La Silla || E. W. Elst || EOS || align=right | 8.8 km || 
|-id=495 bgcolor=#fefefe
| 16495 ||  || — || September 22, 1990 || La Silla || E. W. Elst || — || align=right | 2.1 km || 
|-id=496 bgcolor=#d6d6d6
| 16496 ||  || — || September 22, 1990 || La Silla || E. W. Elst || EOS || align=right | 6.3 km || 
|-id=497 bgcolor=#fefefe
| 16497 Toinevermeylen ||  ||  || September 22, 1990 || La Silla || E. W. Elst || FLO || align=right | 3.3 km || 
|-id=498 bgcolor=#E9E9E9
| 16498 Passau ||  ||  || September 22, 1990 || La Silla || E. W. Elst || WAT || align=right | 6.6 km || 
|-id=499 bgcolor=#fefefe
| 16499 ||  || — || September 22, 1990 || La Silla || E. W. Elst || FLO || align=right | 3.3 km || 
|-id=500 bgcolor=#fefefe
| 16500 ||  || — || September 16, 1990 || Palomar || H. E. Holt || — || align=right | 5.3 km || 
|}

16501–16600 

|-bgcolor=#fefefe
| 16501 ||  || — || September 23, 1990 || La Silla || H. Debehogne || — || align=right | 2.1 km || 
|-id=502 bgcolor=#d6d6d6
| 16502 ||  || — || September 23, 1990 || La Silla || H. Debehogne || — || align=right | 5.1 km || 
|-id=503 bgcolor=#fefefe
| 16503 Ayato || 1990 TY ||  || October 15, 1990 || Geisei || T. Seki || PHO || align=right | 3.8 km || 
|-id=504 bgcolor=#fefefe
| 16504 ||  || — || October 9, 1990 || Siding Spring || R. H. McNaught || — || align=right | 2.9 km || 
|-id=505 bgcolor=#d6d6d6
| 16505 Sulzer ||  ||  || October 12, 1990 || Tautenburg Observatory || F. Börngen, L. D. Schmadel || EOS || align=right | 7.7 km || 
|-id=506 bgcolor=#fefefe
| 16506 ||  || — || October 20, 1990 || Siding Spring || R. H. McNaught || — || align=right | 8.1 km || 
|-id=507 bgcolor=#d6d6d6
| 16507 Fuuren ||  ||  || October 24, 1990 || Kitami || K. Endate, K. Watanabe || EOS || align=right | 8.7 km || 
|-id=508 bgcolor=#fefefe
| 16508 ||  || — || October 19, 1990 || Dynic || A. Sugie || — || align=right | 2.9 km || 
|-id=509 bgcolor=#d6d6d6
| 16509 ||  || — || October 16, 1990 || La Silla || E. W. Elst || HYG || align=right | 11 km || 
|-id=510 bgcolor=#fefefe
| 16510 ||  || — || October 16, 1990 || La Silla || E. W. Elst || V || align=right | 4.0 km || 
|-id=511 bgcolor=#fefefe
| 16511 ||  || — || October 16, 1990 || La Silla || E. W. Elst || — || align=right | 3.0 km || 
|-id=512 bgcolor=#fefefe
| 16512 ||  || — || November 15, 1990 || La Silla || E. W. Elst || V || align=right | 3.1 km || 
|-id=513 bgcolor=#E9E9E9
| 16513 Vasks ||  ||  || November 15, 1990 || La Silla || E. W. Elst || — || align=right | 7.8 km || 
|-id=514 bgcolor=#d6d6d6
| 16514 Stevelia ||  ||  || November 11, 1990 || Palomar || C. S. Shoemaker, D. H. Levy || — || align=right | 7.6 km || 
|-id=515 bgcolor=#d6d6d6
| 16515 Usmanʹgrad ||  ||  || November 15, 1990 || Nauchnij || L. I. Chernykh || THM || align=right | 11 km || 
|-id=516 bgcolor=#fefefe
| 16516 Efremlevitan ||  ||  || November 15, 1990 || Nauchnij || L. I. Chernykh || NYS || align=right | 6.4 km || 
|-id=517 bgcolor=#fefefe
| 16517 || 1990 WD || — || November 19, 1990 || Siding Spring || R. H. McNaught || — || align=right | 4.2 km || 
|-id=518 bgcolor=#fefefe
| 16518 Akihikoito || 1990 WF ||  || November 16, 1990 || Okutama || T. Hioki, S. Hayakawa || FLO || align=right | 4.9 km || 
|-id=519 bgcolor=#fefefe
| 16519 || 1990 WV || — || November 18, 1990 || La Silla || E. W. Elst || FLO || align=right | 2.8 km || 
|-id=520 bgcolor=#fefefe
| 16520 ||  || — || November 21, 1990 || La Silla || E. W. Elst || FLO || align=right | 2.9 km || 
|-id=521 bgcolor=#d6d6d6
| 16521 ||  || — || November 18, 1990 || La Silla || E. W. Elst || TEL || align=right | 5.8 km || 
|-id=522 bgcolor=#d6d6d6
| 16522 Tell ||  ||  || January 15, 1991 || Tautenburg Observatory || F. Börngen || URS || align=right | 13 km || 
|-id=523 bgcolor=#E9E9E9
| 16523 || 1991 BP || — || January 19, 1991 || Dynic || A. Sugie || — || align=right | 5.5 km || 
|-id=524 bgcolor=#fefefe
| 16524 Hausmann ||  ||  || January 17, 1991 || Tautenburg Observatory || F. Börngen || NYS || align=right | 2.9 km || 
|-id=525 bgcolor=#fefefe
| 16525 Shumarinaiko ||  ||  || February 14, 1991 || Kitami || K. Endate, K. Watanabe || NYSmoon || align=right | 5.3 km || 
|-id=526 bgcolor=#fefefe
| 16526 || 1991 DC || — || February 17, 1991 || Yorii || M. Arai, H. Mori || — || align=right | 4.1 km || 
|-id=527 bgcolor=#E9E9E9
| 16527 ||  || — || February 18, 1991 || Palomar || E. F. Helin || — || align=right | 7.5 km || 
|-id=528 bgcolor=#E9E9E9
| 16528 Terakado || 1991 GV ||  || April 2, 1991 || Kitami || K. Endate, K. Watanabe || RAF || align=right | 8.2 km || 
|-id=529 bgcolor=#FA8072
| 16529 Dangoldin ||  ||  || April 9, 1991 || Palomar || E. F. Helin || PHO || align=right | 5.2 km || 
|-id=530 bgcolor=#fefefe
| 16530 ||  || — || April 8, 1991 || La Silla || E. W. Elst || — || align=right | 4.3 km || 
|-id=531 bgcolor=#E9E9E9
| 16531 ||  || — || April 8, 1991 || La Silla || E. W. Elst || — || align=right | 2.7 km || 
|-id=532 bgcolor=#E9E9E9
| 16532 || 1991 LY || — || June 14, 1991 || Palomar || E. F. Helin || — || align=right | 6.7 km || 
|-id=533 bgcolor=#E9E9E9
| 16533 ||  || — || June 14, 1991 || Palomar || E. F. Helin || — || align=right | 4.8 km || 
|-id=534 bgcolor=#fefefe
| 16534 ||  || — || July 10, 1991 || Palomar || E. F. Helin || — || align=right | 4.1 km || 
|-id=535 bgcolor=#E9E9E9
| 16535 ||  || — || July 4, 1991 || La Silla || H. Debehogne || EUN || align=right | 6.2 km || 
|-id=536 bgcolor=#E9E9E9
| 16536 ||  || — || August 10, 1991 || La Silla || E. W. Elst || — || align=right | 6.0 km || 
|-id=537 bgcolor=#E9E9E9
| 16537 ||  || — || August 8, 1991 || Palomar || H. E. Holt || GEF || align=right | 6.0 km || 
|-id=538 bgcolor=#fefefe
| 16538 ||  || — || August 5, 1991 || Palomar || H. E. Holt || — || align=right | 3.9 km || 
|-id=539 bgcolor=#E9E9E9
| 16539 ||  || — || August 5, 1991 || Palomar || H. E. Holt || — || align=right | 8.0 km || 
|-id=540 bgcolor=#E9E9E9
| 16540 ||  || — || August 7, 1991 || Palomar || H. E. Holt || EUN || align=right | 5.9 km || 
|-id=541 bgcolor=#d6d6d6
| 16541 ||  || — || August 8, 1991 || Palomar || H. E. Holt || KOR || align=right | 8.6 km || 
|-id=542 bgcolor=#d6d6d6
| 16542 ||  || — || August 14, 1991 || La Silla || E. W. Elst || — || align=right | 10 km || 
|-id=543 bgcolor=#fefefe
| 16543 Rosetta ||  ||  || September 5, 1991 || Haute Provence || E. W. Elst || — || align=right | 3.8 km || 
|-id=544 bgcolor=#d6d6d6
| 16544 Hochlehnert ||  ||  || September 9, 1991 || Tautenburg Observatory || L. D. Schmadel, F. Börngen || CHA || align=right | 5.4 km || 
|-id=545 bgcolor=#fefefe
| 16545 ||  || — || September 9, 1991 || Kiyosato || S. Otomo || — || align=right | 3.3 km || 
|-id=546 bgcolor=#d6d6d6
| 16546 ||  || — || September 13, 1991 || Palomar || H. E. Holt || ALA || align=right | 19 km || 
|-id=547 bgcolor=#E9E9E9
| 16547 ||  || — || September 7, 1991 || Palomar || E. F. Helin || — || align=right | 9.0 km || 
|-id=548 bgcolor=#fefefe
| 16548 ||  || — || September 10, 1991 || Palomar || H. E. Holt || — || align=right | 3.2 km || 
|-id=549 bgcolor=#E9E9E9
| 16549 ||  || — || September 12, 1991 || Palomar || H. E. Holt || DOR || align=right | 13 km || 
|-id=550 bgcolor=#E9E9E9
| 16550 ||  || — || September 10, 1991 || Palomar || H. E. Holt || DOR || align=right | 8.7 km || 
|-id=551 bgcolor=#E9E9E9
| 16551 ||  || — || September 15, 1991 || Palomar || H. E. Holt || — || align=right | 7.8 km || 
|-id=552 bgcolor=#fefefe
| 16552 Sawamura || 1991 SB ||  || September 16, 1991 || Kitami || K. Endate, K. Watanabe || — || align=right | 7.3 km || 
|-id=553 bgcolor=#fefefe
| 16553 ||  || — || October 7, 1991 || Palomar || C. P. de Saint-Aignan || FLO || align=right | 2.3 km || 
|-id=554 bgcolor=#E9E9E9
| 16554 ||  || — || October 29, 1991 || Kushiro || S. Ueda, H. Kaneda || — || align=right | 7.6 km || 
|-id=555 bgcolor=#E9E9E9
| 16555 Nagaomasami ||  ||  || October 31, 1991 || Kitami || K. Endate, K. Watanabe || MAR || align=right | 6.6 km || 
|-id=556 bgcolor=#fefefe
| 16556 ||  || — || November 4, 1991 || Kushiro || S. Ueda, H. Kaneda || FLO || align=right | 4.4 km || 
|-id=557 bgcolor=#E9E9E9
| 16557 ||  || — || November 9, 1991 || Kushiro || S. Ueda, H. Kaneda || — || align=right | 5.6 km || 
|-id=558 bgcolor=#fefefe
| 16558 ||  || — || November 1, 1991 || Palomar || E. F. Helin || PHOslow? || align=right | 5.7 km || 
|-id=559 bgcolor=#E9E9E9
| 16559 ||  || — || November 9, 1991 || Dynic || A. Sugie || — || align=right | 6.5 km || 
|-id=560 bgcolor=#C2FFFF
| 16560 Daitor ||  ||  || November 2, 1991 || La Silla || E. W. Elst || L5 || align=right | 44 km || 
|-id=561 bgcolor=#d6d6d6
| 16561 Rawls ||  ||  || November 3, 1991 || Kitt Peak || Spacewatch || — || align=right | 6.9 km || 
|-id=562 bgcolor=#fefefe
| 16562 ||  || — || January 9, 1992 || Palomar || E. F. Helin || H || align=right | 2.7 km || 
|-id=563 bgcolor=#d6d6d6
| 16563 Ob ||  ||  || January 30, 1992 || La Silla || E. W. Elst || — || align=right | 16 km || 
|-id=564 bgcolor=#d6d6d6
| 16564 Coriolis ||  ||  || January 30, 1992 || La Silla || E. W. Elst || EOS || align=right | 6.4 km || 
|-id=565 bgcolor=#d6d6d6
| 16565 ||  || — || February 12, 1992 || Mérida || O. A. Naranjo, J. Stock || — || align=right | 16 km || 
|-id=566 bgcolor=#fefefe
| 16566 ||  || — || February 2, 1992 || La Silla || E. W. Elst || FLO || align=right | 3.2 km || 
|-id=567 bgcolor=#fefefe
| 16567 ||  || — || February 2, 1992 || La Silla || E. W. Elst || FLO || align=right | 2.6 km || 
|-id=568 bgcolor=#d6d6d6
| 16568 ||  || — || February 29, 1992 || La Silla || UESAC || THM || align=right | 11 km || 
|-id=569 bgcolor=#d6d6d6
| 16569 ||  || — || February 29, 1992 || La Silla || UESAC || HYG || align=right | 10 km || 
|-id=570 bgcolor=#fefefe
| 16570 ||  || — || February 29, 1992 || La Silla || UESAC || NYS || align=right | 4.4 km || 
|-id=571 bgcolor=#fefefe
| 16571 || 1992 EE || — || March 2, 1992 || Kushiro || S. Ueda, H. Kaneda || — || align=right | 5.9 km || 
|-id=572 bgcolor=#d6d6d6
| 16572 ||  || — || March 2, 1992 || La Silla || UESAC || — || align=right | 12 km || 
|-id=573 bgcolor=#d6d6d6
| 16573 ||  || — || March 2, 1992 || La Silla || UESAC || — || align=right | 9.8 km || 
|-id=574 bgcolor=#fefefe
| 16574 ||  || — || March 6, 1992 || La Silla || UESAC || — || align=right | 2.8 km || 
|-id=575 bgcolor=#d6d6d6
| 16575 ||  || — || March 6, 1992 || La Silla || UESAC || THM || align=right | 9.9 km || 
|-id=576 bgcolor=#d6d6d6
| 16576 ||  || — || March 6, 1992 || La Silla || UESAC || THM || align=right | 9.1 km || 
|-id=577 bgcolor=#fefefe
| 16577 ||  || — || March 2, 1992 || La Silla || UESAC || — || align=right | 2.4 km || 
|-id=578 bgcolor=#fefefe
| 16578 Essjayess ||  ||  || March 29, 1992 || Siding Spring || D. I. Steel || — || align=right | 4.3 km || 
|-id=579 bgcolor=#E9E9E9
| 16579 || 1992 GO || — || April 3, 1992 || Kushiro || S. Ueda, H. Kaneda || EUN || align=right | 7.2 km || 
|-id=580 bgcolor=#fefefe
| 16580 || 1992 HA || — || April 21, 1992 || Kiyosato || S. Otomo || V || align=right | 2.7 km || 
|-id=581 bgcolor=#fefefe
| 16581 ||  || — || May 8, 1992 || La Silla || H. Debehogne || NYS || align=right | 3.5 km || 
|-id=582 bgcolor=#fefefe
| 16582 ||  || — || May 11, 1992 || La Silla || H. Debehogne || — || align=right | 5.9 km || 
|-id=583 bgcolor=#d6d6d6
| 16583 Oersted ||  ||  || July 26, 1992 || La Silla || E. W. Elst || ALA || align=right | 22 km || 
|-id=584 bgcolor=#fefefe
| 16584 || 1992 PM || — || August 8, 1992 || Caussols || E. W. Elst || NYS || align=right | 6.8 km || 
|-id=585 bgcolor=#fefefe
| 16585 || 1992 QR || — || August 23, 1992 || Palomar || H. E. Holt || H || align=right | 1.9 km || 
|-id=586 bgcolor=#E9E9E9
| 16586 ||  || — || September 2, 1992 || La Silla || E. W. Elst || — || align=right | 1.9 km || 
|-id=587 bgcolor=#E9E9E9
| 16587 Nagamori || 1992 SE ||  || September 21, 1992 || Kitami || K. Endate, K. Watanabe || MIT || align=right | 7.5 km || 
|-id=588 bgcolor=#FA8072
| 16588 Johngee || 1992 ST ||  || September 23, 1992 || Palomar || E. F. Helin || — || align=right | 2.6 km || 
|-id=589 bgcolor=#fefefe
| 16589 Hastrup ||  ||  || September 24, 1992 || Palomar || E. F. Helin || Hslow || align=right | 2.2 km || 
|-id=590 bgcolor=#E9E9E9
| 16590 Brunowalter ||  ||  || September 21, 1992 || Tautenburg Observatory || F. Börngen, L. D. Schmadel || — || align=right | 4.7 km || 
|-id=591 bgcolor=#FA8072
| 16591 ||  || — || September 30, 1992 || Palomar || H. E. Holt || — || align=right | 4.0 km || 
|-id=592 bgcolor=#E9E9E9
| 16592 ||  || — || October 3, 1992 || Palomar || H. E. Holt || EUNslow || align=right | 11 km || 
|-id=593 bgcolor=#E9E9E9
| 16593 ||  || — || October 25, 1992 || Okutama || T. Hioki, S. Hayakawa || — || align=right | 14 km || 
|-id=594 bgcolor=#E9E9E9
| 16594 Sorachi ||  ||  || October 26, 1992 || Kitami || K. Endate, K. Watanabe || — || align=right | 7.8 km || 
|-id=595 bgcolor=#E9E9E9
| 16595 ||  || — || October 20, 1992 || Palomar || H. E. Holt || EUN || align=right | 5.4 km || 
|-id=596 bgcolor=#fefefe
| 16596 Stephenstrauss ||  ||  || October 18, 1992 || Kitt Peak || Spacewatch || NYS || align=right | 2.8 km || 
|-id=597 bgcolor=#E9E9E9
| 16597 ||  || — || December 18, 1992 || Caussols || E. W. Elst || — || align=right | 11 km || 
|-id=598 bgcolor=#E9E9E9
| 16598 Brugmansia ||  ||  || December 18, 1992 || Caussols || E. W. Elst || 524 || align=right | 5.1 km || 
|-id=599 bgcolor=#d6d6d6
| 16599 Shorland ||  ||  || January 20, 1993 || Yatsugatake || Y. Kushida, O. Muramatsu || — || align=right | 10 km || 
|-id=600 bgcolor=#fefefe
| 16600 || 1993 DQ || — || February 21, 1993 || Kushiro || S. Ueda, H. Kaneda || — || align=right | 3.4 km || 
|}

16601–16700 

|-bgcolor=#fefefe
| 16601 ||  || — || March 25, 1993 || Kushiro || S. Ueda, H. Kaneda || V || align=right | 3.5 km || 
|-id=602 bgcolor=#fefefe
| 16602 Anabuki ||  ||  || March 17, 1993 || Geisei || T. Seki || FLO || align=right | 3.8 km || 
|-id=603 bgcolor=#d6d6d6
| 16603 ||  || — || March 17, 1993 || La Silla || UESAC || — || align=right | 8.2 km || 
|-id=604 bgcolor=#d6d6d6
| 16604 ||  || — || March 17, 1993 || La Silla || UESAC || EOS || align=right | 6.8 km || 
|-id=605 bgcolor=#fefefe
| 16605 ||  || — || March 17, 1993 || La Silla || UESAC || — || align=right | 4.1 km || 
|-id=606 bgcolor=#fefefe
| 16606 ||  || — || March 17, 1993 || La Silla || UESAC || — || align=right | 4.9 km || 
|-id=607 bgcolor=#d6d6d6
| 16607 ||  || — || March 17, 1993 || La Silla || UESAC || HYG || align=right | 8.9 km || 
|-id=608 bgcolor=#d6d6d6
| 16608 ||  || — || March 21, 1993 || La Silla || UESAC || — || align=right | 7.1 km || 
|-id=609 bgcolor=#d6d6d6
| 16609 ||  || — || March 21, 1993 || La Silla || UESAC || — || align=right | 8.1 km || 
|-id=610 bgcolor=#E9E9E9
| 16610 ||  || — || March 21, 1993 || La Silla || UESAC || — || align=right | 5.5 km || 
|-id=611 bgcolor=#d6d6d6
| 16611 ||  || — || March 21, 1993 || La Silla || UESAC || — || align=right | 9.2 km || 
|-id=612 bgcolor=#fefefe
| 16612 ||  || — || March 21, 1993 || La Silla || UESAC || FLO || align=right | 2.6 km || 
|-id=613 bgcolor=#d6d6d6
| 16613 ||  || — || March 21, 1993 || La Silla || UESAC || — || align=right | 6.8 km || 
|-id=614 bgcolor=#d6d6d6
| 16614 ||  || — || March 19, 1993 || La Silla || UESAC || — || align=right | 11 km || 
|-id=615 bgcolor=#d6d6d6
| 16615 ||  || — || March 19, 1993 || La Silla || UESAC || THM || align=right | 7.0 km || 
|-id=616 bgcolor=#d6d6d6
| 16616 ||  || — || March 19, 1993 || La Silla || UESAC || KOR || align=right | 5.8 km || 
|-id=617 bgcolor=#fefefe
| 16617 ||  || — || March 19, 1993 || La Silla || UESAC || — || align=right | 2.1 km || 
|-id=618 bgcolor=#fefefe
| 16618 ||  || — || March 17, 1993 || La Silla || UESAC || — || align=right | 2.0 km || 
|-id=619 bgcolor=#d6d6d6
| 16619 ||  || — || March 19, 1993 || La Silla || UESAC || — || align=right | 9.0 km || 
|-id=620 bgcolor=#d6d6d6
| 16620 ||  || — || March 21, 1993 || La Silla || UESAC || — || align=right | 6.8 km || 
|-id=621 bgcolor=#E9E9E9
| 16621 ||  || — || March 23, 1993 || La Silla || UESAC || GEF || align=right | 4.0 km || 
|-id=622 bgcolor=#d6d6d6
| 16622 ||  || — || April 15, 1993 || Palomar || H. E. Holt || HYG || align=right | 11 km || 
|-id=623 bgcolor=#d6d6d6
| 16623 Muenzel ||  ||  || April 14, 1993 || La Silla || H. Debehogne || HYG || align=right | 12 km || 
|-id=624 bgcolor=#fefefe
| 16624 Hoshizawa || 1993 HX ||  || April 16, 1993 || Kitami || K. Endate, K. Watanabe || — || align=right | 4.3 km || 
|-id=625 bgcolor=#fefefe
| 16625 Kunitsugu ||  ||  || April 20, 1993 || Kitami || K. Endate, K. Watanabe || — || align=right | 3.4 km || 
|-id=626 bgcolor=#d6d6d6
| 16626 Thumper ||  ||  || April 20, 1993 || Kitt Peak || Spacewatch || KOR || align=right | 6.0 km || 
|-id=627 bgcolor=#fefefe
| 16627 || 1993 JK || — || May 14, 1993 || Kushiro || S. Ueda, H. Kaneda || FLO || align=right | 3.7 km || 
|-id=628 bgcolor=#d6d6d6
| 16628 || 1993 KF || — || May 16, 1993 || Kiyosato || S. Otomo || EOS || align=right | 12 km || 
|-id=629 bgcolor=#fefefe
| 16629 ||  || — || June 15, 1993 || Palomar || H. E. Holt || — || align=right | 3.5 km || 
|-id=630 bgcolor=#d6d6d6
| 16630 ||  || — || July 12, 1993 || La Silla || E. W. Elst || EOS || align=right | 10 km || 
|-id=631 bgcolor=#fefefe
| 16631 ||  || — || July 20, 1993 || La Silla || E. W. Elst || — || align=right | 3.2 km || 
|-id=632 bgcolor=#fefefe
| 16632 ||  || — || July 20, 1993 || La Silla || E. W. Elst || — || align=right | 1.9 km || 
|-id=633 bgcolor=#fefefe
| 16633 ||  || — || July 20, 1993 || La Silla || E. W. Elst || FLO || align=right | 1.8 km || 
|-id=634 bgcolor=#fefefe
| 16634 ||  || — || July 20, 1993 || La Silla || E. W. Elst || — || align=right | 2.3 km || 
|-id=635 bgcolor=#FA8072
| 16635 || 1993 QO || — || August 20, 1993 || Palomar || E. F. Helin || PHOmoon || align=right | 3.1 km || 
|-id=636 bgcolor=#FFC2E0
| 16636 || 1993 QP || — || August 23, 1993 || Palomar || E. F. Helin, K. J. Lawrence || AMO || align=right data-sort-value="0.65" | 650 m || 
|-id=637 bgcolor=#fefefe
| 16637 ||  || — || August 16, 1993 || Caussols || E. W. Elst || — || align=right | 2.7 km || 
|-id=638 bgcolor=#E9E9E9
| 16638 ||  || — || August 18, 1993 || Caussols || E. W. Elst || — || align=right | 7.6 km || 
|-id=639 bgcolor=#fefefe
| 16639 ||  || — || August 18, 1993 || Caussols || E. W. Elst || — || align=right | 4.1 km || 
|-id=640 bgcolor=#fefefe
| 16640 ||  || — || August 20, 1993 || La Silla || E. W. Elst || — || align=right | 1.9 km || 
|-id=641 bgcolor=#fefefe
| 16641 Esteban ||  ||  || August 16, 1993 || Palomar || C. S. Shoemaker, E. M. Shoemaker || — || align=right | 5.7 km || 
|-id=642 bgcolor=#fefefe
| 16642 ||  || — || September 15, 1993 || La Silla || E. W. Elst || NYS || align=right | 2.7 km || 
|-id=643 bgcolor=#fefefe
| 16643 ||  || — || September 15, 1993 || La Silla || H. Debehogne, E. W. Elst || V || align=right | 7.7 km || 
|-id=644 bgcolor=#fefefe
| 16644 Otemaedaigaku ||  ||  || September 16, 1993 || Kitami || K. Endate, K. Watanabe || V || align=right | 3.5 km || 
|-id=645 bgcolor=#fefefe
| 16645 Aldalara ||  ||  || September 22, 1993 || Mérida || O. A. Naranjo || — || align=right | 3.4 km || 
|-id=646 bgcolor=#fefefe
| 16646 Sparrman ||  ||  || September 19, 1993 || Caussols || E. W. Elst || V || align=right | 3.8 km || 
|-id=647 bgcolor=#fefefe
| 16647 Robbydesmet ||  ||  || September 17, 1993 || La Silla || E. W. Elst || — || align=right | 3.4 km || 
|-id=648 bgcolor=#fefefe
| 16648 ||  || — || September 17, 1993 || La Silla || E. W. Elst || — || align=right | 3.2 km || 
|-id=649 bgcolor=#fefefe
| 16649 ||  || — || October 15, 1993 || Kitami || K. Endate, K. Watanabe || V || align=right | 2.6 km || 
|-id=650 bgcolor=#fefefe
| 16650 Sakushingakuin ||  ||  || October 11, 1993 || Kitami || K. Endate, K. Watanabe || — || align=right | 4.6 km || 
|-id=651 bgcolor=#fefefe
| 16651 ||  || — || October 13, 1993 || Palomar || H. E. Holt || — || align=right | 3.0 km || 
|-id=652 bgcolor=#fefefe
| 16652 ||  || — || October 13, 1993 || Palomar || H. E. Holt || NYS || align=right | 4.3 km || 
|-id=653 bgcolor=#fefefe
| 16653 ||  || — || October 9, 1993 || La Silla || E. W. Elst || V || align=right | 3.8 km || 
|-id=654 bgcolor=#fefefe
| 16654 ||  || — || October 9, 1993 || La Silla || E. W. Elst || — || align=right | 3.4 km || 
|-id=655 bgcolor=#fefefe
| 16655 ||  || — || October 9, 1993 || La Silla || E. W. Elst || — || align=right | 2.7 km || 
|-id=656 bgcolor=#fefefe
| 16656 ||  || — || October 9, 1993 || La Silla || E. W. Elst || — || align=right | 2.2 km || 
|-id=657 bgcolor=#FFC2E0
| 16657 || 1993 UB || — || October 23, 1993 || Siding Spring || R. H. McNaught || AMO +1km || align=right | 1.6 km || 
|-id=658 bgcolor=#fefefe
| 16658 ||  || — || October 26, 1993 || Farra d'Isonzo || Farra d'Isonzo || FLO || align=right | 2.0 km || 
|-id=659 bgcolor=#fefefe
| 16659 ||  || — || October 19, 1993 || Palomar || E. F. Helin || PHO || align=right | 4.2 km || 
|-id=660 bgcolor=#fefefe
| 16660 ||  || — || October 20, 1993 || La Silla || E. W. Elst || V || align=right | 3.7 km || 
|-id=661 bgcolor=#fefefe
| 16661 ||  || — || November 11, 1993 || Kushiro || S. Ueda, H. Kaneda || — || align=right | 3.3 km || 
|-id=662 bgcolor=#d6d6d6
| 16662 ||  || — || November 11, 1993 || Kushiro || S. Ueda, H. Kaneda || — || align=right | 12 km || 
|-id=663 bgcolor=#d6d6d6
| 16663 ||  || — || November 11, 1993 || Kushiro || S. Ueda, H. Kaneda || EOS || align=right | 10 km || 
|-id=664 bgcolor=#fefefe
| 16664 ||  || — || November 9, 1993 || Caussols || E. W. Elst || ERI || align=right | 7.4 km || 
|-id=665 bgcolor=#fefefe
| 16665 || 1993 XK || — || December 8, 1993 || Oizumi || T. Kobayashi || — || align=right | 3.0 km || 
|-id=666 bgcolor=#fefefe
| 16666 Liroma ||  ||  || December 7, 1993 || Palomar || C. S. Shoemaker || PHO || align=right | 6.8 km || 
|-id=667 bgcolor=#C2FFFF
| 16667 ||  || — || December 10, 1993 || Kitt Peak || Spacewatch || L5 || align=right | 35 km || 
|-id=668 bgcolor=#E9E9E9
| 16668 ||  || — || December 15, 1993 || Oizumi || T. Kobayashi || — || align=right | 6.2 km || 
|-id=669 bgcolor=#fefefe
| 16669 Rionuevo ||  ||  || December 8, 1993 || Palomar || C. S. Shoemaker, D. H. Levy || H || align=right | 4.0 km || 
|-id=670 bgcolor=#fefefe
| 16670 ||  || — || January 14, 1994 || Oizumi || T. Kobayashi || NYS || align=right | 2.7 km || 
|-id=671 bgcolor=#d6d6d6
| 16671 Tago ||  ||  || January 13, 1994 || Kitami || K. Endate, K. Watanabe || — || align=right | 20 km || 
|-id=672 bgcolor=#E9E9E9
| 16672 Bedini ||  ||  || January 17, 1994 || Cima Ekar || A. Boattini, M. Tombelli || — || align=right | 3.1 km || 
|-id=673 bgcolor=#fefefe
| 16673 ||  || — || January 23, 1994 || Oizumi || T. Kobayashi || — || align=right | 3.8 km || 
|-id=674 bgcolor=#E9E9E9
| 16674 Birkeland ||  ||  || January 16, 1994 || Caussols || E. W. Elst, C. Pollas || — || align=right | 6.2 km || 
|-id=675 bgcolor=#fefefe
| 16675 Torii ||  ||  || February 8, 1994 || Kitami || K. Endate, K. Watanabe || — || align=right | 4.5 km || 
|-id=676 bgcolor=#E9E9E9
| 16676 Tinne ||  ||  || February 11, 1994 || Kitt Peak || Spacewatch || — || align=right | 4.5 km || 
|-id=677 bgcolor=#E9E9E9
| 16677 ||  || — || February 7, 1994 || La Silla || E. W. Elst || — || align=right | 5.9 km || 
|-id=678 bgcolor=#E9E9E9
| 16678 ||  || — || February 8, 1994 || La Silla || E. W. Elst || EUN || align=right | 3.0 km || 
|-id=679 bgcolor=#E9E9E9
| 16679 ||  || — || March 14, 1994 || Kiyosato || S. Otomo || GEF || align=right | 6.5 km || 
|-id=680 bgcolor=#E9E9E9
| 16680 Minamitanemachi ||  ||  || March 14, 1994 || Kitami || K. Endate, K. Watanabe || — || align=right | 8.0 km || 
|-id=681 bgcolor=#fefefe
| 16681 ||  || — || March 11, 1994 || Palomar || E. F. Helin || H || align=right | 4.3 km || 
|-id=682 bgcolor=#fefefe
| 16682 Donati || 1994 FB ||  || March 18, 1994 || Sormano || M. Cavagna, V. Giuliani || — || align=right | 2.2 km || 
|-id=683 bgcolor=#d6d6d6
| 16683 Alepieri || 1994 JY ||  || May 3, 1994 || San Marcello || L. Tesi, G. Cattani || — || align=right | 11 km || 
|-id=684 bgcolor=#C2E0FF
| 16684 ||  || — || May 11, 1994 || La Palma || M. J. Irwin, A. Żytkow || cubewano (cold)critical || align=right | 199 km || 
|-id=685 bgcolor=#E9E9E9
| 16685 ||  || — || May 8, 1994 || Kiyosato || S. Otomo || — || align=right | 8.0 km || 
|-id=686 bgcolor=#d6d6d6
| 16686 ||  || — || August 10, 1994 || La Silla || E. W. Elst || — || align=right | 16 km || 
|-id=687 bgcolor=#fefefe
| 16687 ||  || — || August 12, 1994 || La Silla || E. W. Elst || MAS || align=right | 1.7 km || 
|-id=688 bgcolor=#d6d6d6
| 16688 ||  || — || August 12, 1994 || La Silla || E. W. Elst || THM || align=right | 9.5 km || 
|-id=689 bgcolor=#d6d6d6
| 16689 Vistula ||  ||  || August 12, 1994 || La Silla || E. W. Elst || — || align=right | 10 km || 
|-id=690 bgcolor=#fefefe
| 16690 Fabritius ||  ||  || October 28, 1994 || Kitt Peak || Spacewatch || — || align=right | 2.6 km || 
|-id=691 bgcolor=#fefefe
| 16691 || 1994 VS || — || November 3, 1994 || Oizumi || T. Kobayashi || fast? || align=right | 2.7 km || 
|-id=692 bgcolor=#fefefe
| 16692 ||  || — || November 3, 1994 || Oizumi || T. Kobayashi || — || align=right | 1.9 km || 
|-id=693 bgcolor=#E9E9E9
| 16693 Moseley ||  ||  || December 26, 1994 || Siding Spring || D. J. Asher || EUN || align=right | 5.5 km || 
|-id=694 bgcolor=#fefefe
| 16694 || 1995 AJ || — || January 2, 1995 || Oizumi || T. Kobayashi || FLOmoon || align=right | 4.1 km || 
|-id=695 bgcolor=#FA8072
| 16695 Terryhandley || 1995 AM ||  || January 7, 1995 || Kitt Peak || Spacewatch || — || align=right | 1.1 km || 
|-id=696 bgcolor=#fefefe
| 16696 Villamayor ||  ||  || January 28, 1995 || Kitt Peak || Spacewatch || NYS || align=right | 4.3 km || 
|-id=697 bgcolor=#fefefe
| 16697 || 1995 CQ || — || February 1, 1995 || Kiyosato || S. Otomo || — || align=right | 2.8 km || 
|-id=698 bgcolor=#fefefe
| 16698 || 1995 CX || — || February 3, 1995 || Oizumi || T. Kobayashi || — || align=right | 8.2 km || 
|-id=699 bgcolor=#E9E9E9
| 16699 || 1995 DC || — || February 20, 1995 || Oizumi || T. Kobayashi || — || align=right | 2.8 km || 
|-id=700 bgcolor=#fefefe
| 16700 Seiwa || 1995 DZ ||  || February 22, 1995 || Oizumi || T. Kobayashi || — || align=right | 2.8 km || 
|}

16701–16800 

|-bgcolor=#fefefe
| 16701 Volpe ||  ||  || February 21, 1995 || Kitt Peak || Spacewatch || — || align=right | 3.0 km || 
|-id=702 bgcolor=#fefefe
| 16702 Buxner ||  ||  || February 24, 1995 || Kitt Peak || Spacewatch || NYS || align=right | 5.0 km || 
|-id=703 bgcolor=#fefefe
| 16703 Richardstrauss ||  ||  || March 2, 1995 || Kitt Peak || Spacewatch || — || align=right | 3.1 km || 
|-id=704 bgcolor=#fefefe
| 16704 ||  || — || March 7, 1995 || Nyukasa || M. Hirasawa, S. Suzuki || PHO || align=right | 5.0 km || 
|-id=705 bgcolor=#fefefe
| 16705 Reinhardt ||  ||  || March 4, 1995 || Tautenburg Observatory || F. Börngen || V || align=right | 3.2 km || 
|-id=706 bgcolor=#d6d6d6
| 16706 Svojsík ||  ||  || July 30, 1995 || Ondřejov || P. Pravec || KAR || align=right | 3.3 km || 
|-id=707 bgcolor=#d6d6d6
| 16707 Norman ||  ||  || August 19, 1995 || La Silla || C.-I. Lagerkvist || — || align=right | 6.1 km || 
|-id=708 bgcolor=#d6d6d6
| 16708 ||  || — || September 21, 1995 || Catalina Station || T. B. Spahr || EUP || align=right | 15 km || 
|-id=709 bgcolor=#d6d6d6
| 16709 Auratian ||  ||  || September 29, 1995 || Kleť || J. Tichá || — || align=right | 4.6 km || 
|-id=710 bgcolor=#fefefe
| 16710 Kluyver ||  ||  || September 18, 1995 || Kitt Peak || Spacewatch || — || align=right | 2.1 km || 
|-id=711 bgcolor=#d6d6d6
| 16711 Ka-Dar ||  ||  || September 26, 1995 || Zelenchukskaya || T. V. Kryachko || — || align=right | 12 km || 
|-id=712 bgcolor=#d6d6d6
| 16712 ||  || — || September 30, 1995 || Catalina Station || C. W. Hergenrother || EUP || align=right | 17 km || 
|-id=713 bgcolor=#d6d6d6
| 16713 Airashi ||  ||  || September 20, 1995 || Kitami || K. Endate, K. Watanabe || — || align=right | 14 km || 
|-id=714 bgcolor=#d6d6d6
| 16714 Arndt ||  ||  || September 21, 1995 || Tautenburg Observatory || F. Börngen || KOR || align=right | 6.8 km || 
|-id=715 bgcolor=#d6d6d6
| 16715 Trettenero ||  ||  || October 20, 1995 || Bologna || San Vittore Obs. || LIX || align=right | 9.0 km || 
|-id=716 bgcolor=#d6d6d6
| 16716 ||  || — || October 21, 1995 || Chichibu || N. Satō, T. Urata || THM || align=right | 5.6 km || 
|-id=717 bgcolor=#d6d6d6
| 16717 ||  || — || October 27, 1995 || Oizumi || T. Kobayashi || — || align=right | 10 km || 
|-id=718 bgcolor=#d6d6d6
| 16718 Morikawa ||  ||  || October 30, 1995 || Kitami || K. Endate, K. Watanabe || — || align=right | 13 km || 
|-id=719 bgcolor=#d6d6d6
| 16719 Mizokami ||  ||  || October 28, 1995 || Kitami || K. Endate, K. Watanabe || THM || align=right | 11 km || 
|-id=720 bgcolor=#d6d6d6
| 16720 || 1995 WT || — || November 17, 1995 || Oizumi || T. Kobayashi || — || align=right | 9.1 km || 
|-id=721 bgcolor=#E9E9E9
| 16721 ||  || — || November 16, 1995 || Kushiro || S. Ueda, H. Kaneda || — || align=right | 6.2 km || 
|-id=722 bgcolor=#d6d6d6
| 16722 ||  || — || November 24, 1995 || Nachi-Katsuura || Y. Shimizu, T. Urata || — || align=right | 12 km || 
|-id=723 bgcolor=#d6d6d6
| 16723 Fumiofuke ||  ||  || November 27, 1995 || Chichibu || N. Satō, T. Urata || THM || align=right | 6.8 km || 
|-id=724 bgcolor=#FA8072
| 16724 Ullilotzmann ||  ||  || December 28, 1995 || Kitt Peak || Spacewatch || — || align=right | 8.3 km || 
|-id=725 bgcolor=#E9E9E9
| 16725 Toudono ||  ||  || February 15, 1996 || Nanyo || T. Okuni || HNS || align=right | 7.5 km || 
|-id=726 bgcolor=#fefefe
| 16726 || 1996 DC || — || February 18, 1996 || Oizumi || T. Kobayashi || — || align=right | 3.5 km || 
|-id=727 bgcolor=#fefefe
| 16727 ||  || — || March 15, 1996 || Haleakala || NEAT || FLO || align=right | 2.2 km || 
|-id=728 bgcolor=#fefefe
| 16728 ||  || — || April 15, 1996 || La Silla || E. W. Elst || — || align=right | 2.7 km || 
|-id=729 bgcolor=#fefefe
| 16729 ||  || — || April 15, 1996 || La Silla || E. W. Elst || — || align=right | 2.9 km || 
|-id=730 bgcolor=#fefefe
| 16730 Nijisseiki ||  ||  || April 17, 1996 || Saji || Saji Obs. || — || align=right | 1.7 km || 
|-id=731 bgcolor=#fefefe
| 16731 Mitsumata ||  ||  || April 17, 1996 || Saji || Saji Obs. || — || align=right | 2.2 km || 
|-id=732 bgcolor=#E9E9E9
| 16732 ||  || — || April 18, 1996 || La Silla || E. W. Elst || — || align=right | 3.9 km || 
|-id=733 bgcolor=#fefefe
| 16733 ||  || — || April 22, 1996 || Haleakala || NEAT || — || align=right | 2.2 km || 
|-id=734 bgcolor=#fefefe
| 16734 ||  || — || April 20, 1996 || La Silla || E. W. Elst || — || align=right | 3.3 km || 
|-id=735 bgcolor=#fefefe
| 16735 || 1996 JJ || — || May 8, 1996 || Kushiro || S. Ueda, H. Kaneda || — || align=right | 3.0 km || 
|-id=736 bgcolor=#fefefe
| 16736 Tongariyama ||  ||  || May 13, 1996 || Nanyo || T. Okuni || — || align=right | 5.1 km || 
|-id=737 bgcolor=#fefefe
| 16737 ||  || — || May 24, 1996 || Višnjan Observatory || Višnjan Obs. || V || align=right | 2.7 km || 
|-id=738 bgcolor=#fefefe
| 16738 ||  || — || May 19, 1996 || Xinglong || SCAP || KLI || align=right | 4.0 km || 
|-id=739 bgcolor=#E9E9E9
| 16739 ||  || — || May 24, 1996 || Xinglong || SCAP || — || align=right | 6.1 km || 
|-id=740 bgcolor=#fefefe
| 16740 Kipthorne ||  ||  || May 22, 1996 || La Silla || E. W. Elst || FLO || align=right | 3.0 km || 
|-id=741 bgcolor=#fefefe
| 16741 ||  || — || July 14, 1996 || La Silla || E. W. Elst || — || align=right | 3.0 km || 
|-id=742 bgcolor=#fefefe
| 16742 Zink || 1996 ON ||  || July 21, 1996 || Kleť || J. Tichá, M. Tichý || ERI || align=right | 4.4 km || 
|-id=743 bgcolor=#fefefe
| 16743 || 1996 OQ || — || July 21, 1996 || Haleakala || NEAT || NYS || align=right | 3.0 km || 
|-id=744 bgcolor=#fefefe
| 16744 Antonioleone ||  ||  || July 23, 1996 || San Marcello || L. Tesi || — || align=right | 2.8 km || 
|-id=745 bgcolor=#E9E9E9
| 16745 Zappa ||  ||  || August 9, 1996 || Bologna || San Vittore Obs. || ADE || align=right | 6.2 km || 
|-id=746 bgcolor=#fefefe
| 16746 ||  || — || August 8, 1996 || Nachi-Katsuura || H. Shiozawa, T. Urata || NYS || align=right | 2.8 km || 
|-id=747 bgcolor=#E9E9E9
| 16747 ||  || — || August 8, 1996 || La Silla || E. W. Elst || — || align=right | 3.4 km || 
|-id=748 bgcolor=#d6d6d6
| 16748 ||  || — || August 8, 1996 || La Silla || E. W. Elst || KOR || align=right | 4.4 km || 
|-id=749 bgcolor=#E9E9E9
| 16749 Vospini || 1996 QE ||  || August 16, 1996 || Sormano || P. Sicoli, V. Giuliani || — || align=right | 5.6 km || 
|-id=750 bgcolor=#E9E9E9
| 16750 Marisandoz || 1996 QL ||  || August 18, 1996 || Lime Creek || R. Linderholm || — || align=right | 7.2 km || 
|-id=751 bgcolor=#fefefe
| 16751 ||  || — || August 18, 1996 || Nachi-Katsuura || Y. Shimizu, T. Urata || — || align=right | 3.3 km || 
|-id=752 bgcolor=#fefefe
| 16752 ||  || — || August 22, 1996 || Nachi-Katsuura || Y. Shimizu, T. Urata || NYS || align=right | 3.0 km || 
|-id=753 bgcolor=#fefefe
| 16753 ||  || — || August 21, 1996 || Church Stretton || S. P. Laurie || V || align=right | 3.0 km || 
|-id=754 bgcolor=#E9E9E9
| 16754 || 1996 RW || — || September 10, 1996 || Haleakala || NEAT || — || align=right | 3.8 km || 
|-id=755 bgcolor=#E9E9E9
| 16755 Cayley ||  ||  || September 9, 1996 || Prescott || P. G. Comba || — || align=right | 3.7 km || 
|-id=756 bgcolor=#E9E9E9
| 16756 Keuskamp ||  ||  || September 8, 1996 || Kitt Peak || Spacewatch || — || align=right | 4.0 km || 
|-id=757 bgcolor=#E9E9E9
| 16757 Luoxiahong ||  ||  || September 18, 1996 || Xinglong || SCAP || WIT || align=right | 4.8 km || 
|-id=758 bgcolor=#E9E9E9
| 16758 ||  || — || October 3, 1996 || Xinglong || SCAP || — || align=right | 7.2 km || 
|-id=759 bgcolor=#E9E9E9
| 16759 Furuyama ||  ||  || October 10, 1996 || Kuma Kogen || A. Nakamura || MRX || align=right | 2.2 km || 
|-id=760 bgcolor=#E9E9E9
| 16760 Masanori ||  ||  || October 11, 1996 || Yatsuka || H. Abe || — || align=right | 4.3 km || 
|-id=761 bgcolor=#E9E9E9
| 16761 Hertz ||  ||  || October 3, 1996 || Pianoro || V. Goretti || — || align=right | 5.7 km || 
|-id=762 bgcolor=#fefefe
| 16762 ||  || — || October 9, 1996 || Kushiro || S. Ueda, H. Kaneda || — || align=right | 2.4 km || 
|-id=763 bgcolor=#E9E9E9
| 16763 ||  || — || October 3, 1996 || Xinglong || SCAP || — || align=right | 3.8 km || 
|-id=764 bgcolor=#d6d6d6
| 16764 ||  || — || October 9, 1996 || Nanyo || T. Okuni || KOR || align=right | 4.1 km || 
|-id=765 bgcolor=#E9E9E9
| 16765 Agnesi || 1996 UA ||  || October 16, 1996 || Prescott || P. G. Comba || — || align=right | 4.1 km || 
|-id=766 bgcolor=#E9E9E9
| 16766 Righi || 1996 UP ||  || October 18, 1996 || Pianoro || V. Goretti || GEF || align=right | 6.3 km || 
|-id=767 bgcolor=#E9E9E9
| 16767 || 1996 US || — || October 16, 1996 || Nachi-Katsuura || Y. Shimizu, T. Urata || — || align=right | 3.4 km || 
|-id=768 bgcolor=#d6d6d6
| 16768 ||  || — || October 20, 1996 || Oizumi || T. Kobayashi || — || align=right | 14 km || 
|-id=769 bgcolor=#E9E9E9
| 16769 ||  || — || October 29, 1996 || Toyama || M. Aoki || MAR || align=right | 5.0 km || 
|-id=770 bgcolor=#E9E9E9
| 16770 Angkor Wat ||  ||  || October 30, 1996 || Colleverde || V. S. Casulli || PAD || align=right | 6.7 km || 
|-id=771 bgcolor=#E9E9E9
| 16771 ||  || — || October 19, 1996 || Church Stretton || S. P. Laurie || ADE || align=right | 11 km || 
|-id=772 bgcolor=#E9E9E9
| 16772 ||  || — || October 29, 1996 || Xinglong || SCAP || — || align=right | 4.8 km || 
|-id=773 bgcolor=#E9E9E9
| 16773 ||  || — || November 6, 1996 || Nachi-Katsuura || Y. Shimizu, T. Urata || EUN || align=right | 7.5 km || 
|-id=774 bgcolor=#E9E9E9
| 16774 ||  || — || November 6, 1996 || Nachi-Katsuura || Y. Shimizu, T. Urata || — || align=right | 7.8 km || 
|-id=775 bgcolor=#d6d6d6
| 16775 ||  || — || November 15, 1996 || Oizumi || T. Kobayashi || KOR || align=right | 5.7 km || 
|-id=776 bgcolor=#E9E9E9
| 16776 ||  || — || November 3, 1996 || Kushiro || S. Ueda, H. Kaneda || — || align=right | 3.9 km || 
|-id=777 bgcolor=#d6d6d6
| 16777 Bosma ||  ||  || November 13, 1996 || Kitt Peak || Spacewatch || — || align=right | 8.9 km || 
|-id=778 bgcolor=#d6d6d6
| 16778 ||  || — || November 30, 1996 || Oizumi || T. Kobayashi || EOS || align=right | 6.2 km || 
|-id=779 bgcolor=#E9E9E9
| 16779 Mittelman ||  ||  || November 30, 1996 || Sudbury || D. di Cicco || EUN || align=right | 5.4 km || 
|-id=780 bgcolor=#d6d6d6
| 16780 ||  || — || December 2, 1996 || Oizumi || T. Kobayashi || KOR || align=right | 4.5 km || 
|-id=781 bgcolor=#d6d6d6
| 16781 Renčín ||  ||  || December 12, 1996 || Kleť || M. Tichý, Z. Moravec || THM || align=right | 10 km || 
|-id=782 bgcolor=#d6d6d6
| 16782 ||  || — || December 8, 1996 || Oizumi || T. Kobayashi || — || align=right | 6.5 km || 
|-id=783 bgcolor=#E9E9E9
| 16783 Bychkov ||  ||  || December 14, 1996 || Goodricke-Pigott || R. A. Tucker || EUN || align=right | 4.3 km || 
|-id=784 bgcolor=#d6d6d6
| 16784 ||  || — || December 22, 1996 || Xinglong || SCAP || — || align=right | 10 km || 
|-id=785 bgcolor=#d6d6d6
| 16785 ||  || — || January 2, 1997 || Oizumi || T. Kobayashi || — || align=right | 31 km || 
|-id=786 bgcolor=#d6d6d6
| 16786 ||  || — || January 2, 1997 || Nachi-Katsuura || Y. Shimizu, T. Urata || — || align=right | 25 km || 
|-id=787 bgcolor=#d6d6d6
| 16787 ||  || — || January 3, 1997 || Oizumi || T. Kobayashi || — || align=right | 6.7 km || 
|-id=788 bgcolor=#d6d6d6
| 16788 Alyssarose ||  ||  || January 3, 1997 || Oizumi || T. Kobayashi || THM || align=right | 13 km || 
|-id=789 bgcolor=#d6d6d6
| 16789 ||  || — || January 3, 1997 || Oohira || T. Urata || 629 || align=right | 6.6 km || 
|-id=790 bgcolor=#E9E9E9
| 16790 Yuuzou ||  ||  || January 2, 1997 || Chichibu || N. Satō || — || align=right | 6.7 km || 
|-id=791 bgcolor=#d6d6d6
| 16791 ||  || — || January 7, 1997 || Oizumi || T. Kobayashi || — || align=right | 9.5 km || 
|-id=792 bgcolor=#d6d6d6
| 16792 ||  || — || January 11, 1997 || Oizumi || T. Kobayashi || — || align=right | 12 km || 
|-id=793 bgcolor=#d6d6d6
| 16793 ||  || — || January 15, 1997 || Oizumi || T. Kobayashi || EOS || align=right | 9.7 km || 
|-id=794 bgcolor=#d6d6d6
| 16794 Cucullia ||  ||  || February 2, 1997 || Kleť || J. Tichá, M. Tichý || LUT || align=right | 12 km || 
|-id=795 bgcolor=#d6d6d6
| 16795 ||  || — || February 3, 1997 || Oizumi || T. Kobayashi || — || align=right | 9.5 km || 
|-id=796 bgcolor=#d6d6d6
| 16796 Shinji ||  ||  || February 6, 1997 || Chichibu || N. Satō || — || align=right | 12 km || 
|-id=797 bgcolor=#d6d6d6
| 16797 Wilkerson ||  ||  || February 7, 1997 || San Marcello || A. Boattini, L. Tesi || — || align=right | 12 km || 
|-id=798 bgcolor=#fefefe
| 16798 ||  || — || March 5, 1997 || La Silla || E. W. Elst || V || align=right | 2.0 km || 
|-id=799 bgcolor=#fefefe
| 16799 ||  || — || May 3, 1997 || Xinglong || SCAP || — || align=right | 3.8 km || 
|-id=800 bgcolor=#fefefe
| 16800 ||  || — || May 3, 1997 || La Silla || E. W. Elst || — || align=right | 4.1 km || 
|}

16801–16900 

|-bgcolor=#fefefe
| 16801 Petřínpragensis ||  ||  || September 23, 1997 || Ondřejov || P. Pravec || — || align=right | 4.5 km || 
|-id=802 bgcolor=#fefefe
| 16802 Rainer ||  ||  || September 25, 1997 || Davidschlag || E. Meyer || — || align=right | 2.1 km || 
|-id=803 bgcolor=#fefefe
| 16803 ||  || — || September 26, 1997 || Xinglong || SCAP || FLO || align=right | 2.3 km || 
|-id=804 bgcolor=#fefefe
| 16804 Bonini ||  ||  || September 27, 1997 || Caussols || ODAS || — || align=right | 6.0 km || 
|-id=805 bgcolor=#fefefe
| 16805 ||  || — || September 27, 1997 || Uenohara || N. Kawasato || — || align=right | 5.8 km || 
|-id=806 bgcolor=#fefefe
| 16806 ||  || — || September 17, 1997 || Xinglong || SCAP || — || align=right | 3.7 km || 
|-id=807 bgcolor=#fefefe
| 16807 Terasako ||  ||  || October 12, 1997 || Kuma Kogen || A. Nakamura || FLO || align=right | 2.1 km || 
|-id=808 bgcolor=#fefefe
| 16808 ||  || — || October 8, 1997 || Uenohara || N. Kawasato || — || align=right | 3.6 km || 
|-id=809 bgcolor=#E9E9E9
| 16809 Galápagos || 1997 US ||  || October 21, 1997 || Starkenburg Observatory || Starkenburg Obs. || — || align=right | 4.1 km || 
|-id=810 bgcolor=#fefefe
| 16810 Pavelaleksandrov ||  ||  || October 25, 1997 || Prescott || P. G. Comba || — || align=right | 2.6 km || 
|-id=811 bgcolor=#fefefe
| 16811 ||  || — || October 26, 1997 || Oizumi || T. Kobayashi || — || align=right | 3.7 km || 
|-id=812 bgcolor=#fefefe
| 16812 ||  || — || October 26, 1997 || Oizumi || T. Kobayashi || MAS || align=right | 3.2 km || 
|-id=813 bgcolor=#fefefe
| 16813 Ronmastaler ||  ||  || October 23, 1997 || Kitt Peak || Spacewatch || — || align=right | 2.9 km || 
|-id=814 bgcolor=#fefefe
| 16814 ||  || — || October 29, 1997 || Oizumi || T. Kobayashi || FLO || align=right | 2.6 km || 
|-id=815 bgcolor=#E9E9E9
| 16815 ||  || — || October 29, 1997 || Oizumi || T. Kobayashi || — || align=right | 8.3 km || 
|-id=816 bgcolor=#FFC2E0
| 16816 ||  || — || October 29, 1997 || Socorro || LINEAR || APO +1km || align=right | 2.1 km || 
|-id=817 bgcolor=#fefefe
| 16817 Onderlička ||  ||  || October 30, 1997 || Ondřejov || P. Pravec || — || align=right | 6.3 km || 
|-id=818 bgcolor=#E9E9E9
| 16818 ||  || — || October 28, 1997 || Xinglong || SCAP || MAR || align=right | 8.2 km || 
|-id=819 bgcolor=#E9E9E9
| 16819 || 1997 VW || — || November 1, 1997 || Oizumi || T. Kobayashi || EUNslow || align=right | 8.0 km || 
|-id=820 bgcolor=#fefefe
| 16820 ||  || — || November 6, 1997 || Zeno || T. Stafford || — || align=right | 4.1 km || 
|-id=821 bgcolor=#fefefe
| 16821 ||  || — || November 5, 1997 || Nachi-Katsuura || Y. Shimizu, T. Urata || FLO || align=right | 4.8 km || 
|-id=822 bgcolor=#fefefe
| 16822 ||  || — || November 5, 1997 || Nachi-Katsuura || Y. Shimizu, T. Urata || FLO || align=right | 2.2 km || 
|-id=823 bgcolor=#fefefe
| 16823 ||  || — || November 9, 1997 || Oizumi || T. Kobayashi || — || align=right | 2.3 km || 
|-id=824 bgcolor=#fefefe
| 16824 ||  || — || November 6, 1997 || Xinglong || SCAP || — || align=right | 4.5 km || 
|-id=825 bgcolor=#fefefe
| 16825 ||  || — || November 6, 1997 || Xinglong || SCAP || — || align=right | 3.0 km || 
|-id=826 bgcolor=#fefefe
| 16826 Daisuke ||  ||  || November 19, 1997 || Chichibu || N. Satō || FLO || align=right | 3.0 km || 
|-id=827 bgcolor=#fefefe
| 16827 ||  || — || November 23, 1997 || Oizumi || T. Kobayashi || — || align=right | 4.9 km || 
|-id=828 bgcolor=#fefefe
| 16828 ||  || — || November 23, 1997 || Oizumi || T. Kobayashi || — || align=right | 2.6 km || 
|-id=829 bgcolor=#fefefe
| 16829 Richardfrench ||  ||  || November 24, 1997 || Kitt Peak || Spacewatch || — || align=right | 4.8 km || 
|-id=830 bgcolor=#fefefe
| 16830 ||  || — || November 19, 1997 || Nachi-Katsuura || Y. Shimizu, T. Urata || — || align=right | 2.9 km || 
|-id=831 bgcolor=#fefefe
| 16831 ||  || — || November 30, 1997 || Oizumi || T. Kobayashi || — || align=right | 4.3 km || 
|-id=832 bgcolor=#fefefe
| 16832 ||  || — || November 30, 1997 || Oizumi || T. Kobayashi || FLO || align=right | 3.4 km || 
|-id=833 bgcolor=#E9E9E9
| 16833 ||  || — || November 19, 1997 || Xinglong || SCAP || EUN || align=right | 7.0 km || 
|-id=834 bgcolor=#FFC2E0
| 16834 ||  || — || November 30, 1997 || Haleakala || NEAT || APO +1km || align=right | 1.9 km || 
|-id=835 bgcolor=#fefefe
| 16835 ||  || — || November 29, 1997 || Socorro || LINEAR || NYS || align=right | 4.9 km || 
|-id=836 bgcolor=#fefefe
| 16836 ||  || — || November 29, 1997 || Socorro || LINEAR || NYS || align=right | 3.2 km || 
|-id=837 bgcolor=#fefefe
| 16837 ||  || — || November 29, 1997 || Socorro || LINEAR || NYS || align=right | 2.0 km || 
|-id=838 bgcolor=#d6d6d6
| 16838 ||  || — || November 29, 1997 || Socorro || LINEAR || — || align=right | 9.5 km || 
|-id=839 bgcolor=#d6d6d6
| 16839 ||  || — || November 29, 1997 || Socorro || LINEAR || KOR || align=right | 6.0 km || 
|-id=840 bgcolor=#d6d6d6
| 16840 ||  || — || November 29, 1997 || Socorro || LINEAR || — || align=right | 8.9 km || 
|-id=841 bgcolor=#fefefe
| 16841 ||  || — || November 26, 1997 || Socorro || LINEAR || — || align=right | 2.7 km || 
|-id=842 bgcolor=#d6d6d6
| 16842 ||  || — || December 3, 1997 || Caussols || ODAS || — || align=right | 6.3 km || 
|-id=843 bgcolor=#d6d6d6
| 16843 ||  || — || December 4, 1997 || Caussols || ODAS || 3:2slow || align=right | 17 km || 
|-id=844 bgcolor=#E9E9E9
| 16844 ||  || — || December 4, 1997 || Caussols || ODAS || HOF || align=right | 11 km || 
|-id=845 bgcolor=#d6d6d6
| 16845 ||  || — || December 7, 1997 || Caussols || ODAS || KOR || align=right | 5.7 km || 
|-id=846 bgcolor=#E9E9E9
| 16846 ||  || — || December 5, 1997 || Oizumi || T. Kobayashi || MIS || align=right | 9.0 km || 
|-id=847 bgcolor=#E9E9E9
| 16847 Sanpoloamosciano ||  ||  || December 8, 1997 || San Polo a Mosciano || M. Mannucci, N. Montigiani || — || align=right | 8.6 km || 
|-id=848 bgcolor=#fefefe
| 16848 ||  || — || December 4, 1997 || Socorro || LINEAR || FLO || align=right | 2.1 km || 
|-id=849 bgcolor=#fefefe
| 16849 || 1997 YV || — || December 20, 1997 || Oizumi || T. Kobayashi || NYS || align=right | 3.2 km || 
|-id=850 bgcolor=#fefefe
| 16850 ||  || — || December 20, 1997 || Xinglong || SCAP || V || align=right | 3.5 km || 
|-id=851 bgcolor=#FA8072
| 16851 ||  || — || December 21, 1997 || Xinglong || SCAP || — || align=right | 1.8 km || 
|-id=852 bgcolor=#fefefe
| 16852 Nuredduna ||  ||  || December 21, 1997 || Majorca || Á. López J., R. Pacheco || FLO || align=right | 3.7 km || 
|-id=853 bgcolor=#d6d6d6
| 16853 Masafumi ||  ||  || December 21, 1997 || Chichibu || N. Satō || THM || align=right | 12 km || 
|-id=854 bgcolor=#E9E9E9
| 16854 ||  || — || December 20, 1997 || Xinglong || SCAP || — || align=right | 4.1 km || 
|-id=855 bgcolor=#E9E9E9
| 16855 ||  || — || December 27, 1997 || Oizumi || T. Kobayashi || MAR || align=right | 5.1 km || 
|-id=856 bgcolor=#fefefe
| 16856 Banach ||  ||  || December 28, 1997 || Prescott || P. G. Comba || — || align=right | 2.9 km || 
|-id=857 bgcolor=#fefefe
| 16857 Goodall ||  ||  || December 25, 1997 || Haleakala || NEAT || — || align=right | 2.7 km || 
|-id=858 bgcolor=#E9E9E9
| 16858 ||  || — || December 28, 1997 || Oizumi || T. Kobayashi || — || align=right | 4.3 km || 
|-id=859 bgcolor=#E9E9E9
| 16859 ||  || — || December 28, 1997 || Oizumi || T. Kobayashi || — || align=right | 5.3 km || 
|-id=860 bgcolor=#E9E9E9
| 16860 ||  || — || December 22, 1997 || Xinglong || SCAP || — || align=right | 12 km || 
|-id=861 bgcolor=#E9E9E9
| 16861 Lipovetsky ||  ||  || December 27, 1997 || Goodricke-Pigott || R. A. Tucker || — || align=right | 4.1 km || 
|-id=862 bgcolor=#fefefe
| 16862 ||  || — || December 31, 1997 || Oizumi || T. Kobayashi || — || align=right | 3.2 km || 
|-id=863 bgcolor=#fefefe
| 16863 ||  || — || December 31, 1997 || Nachi-Katsuura || Y. Shimizu, T. Urata || — || align=right | 8.0 km || 
|-id=864 bgcolor=#fefefe
| 16864 || 1998 AL || — || January 5, 1998 || Oizumi || T. Kobayashi || — || align=right | 3.5 km || 
|-id=865 bgcolor=#d6d6d6
| 16865 || 1998 AQ || — || January 5, 1998 || Oizumi || T. Kobayashi || ALA || align=right | 9.9 km || 
|-id=866 bgcolor=#fefefe
| 16866 || 1998 AR || — || January 5, 1998 || Oizumi || T. Kobayashi || — || align=right | 5.3 km || 
|-id=867 bgcolor=#fefefe
| 16867 || 1998 AX || — || January 5, 1998 || Oizumi || T. Kobayashi || V || align=right | 4.8 km || 
|-id=868 bgcolor=#FA8072
| 16868 ||  || — || January 9, 1998 || Caussols || ODAS || — || align=right | 1.1 km || 
|-id=869 bgcolor=#fefefe
| 16869 Košinár ||  ||  || January 10, 1998 || Modra || A. Galád, A. Pravda || FLO || align=right | 2.9 km || 
|-id=870 bgcolor=#fefefe
| 16870 || 1998 BB || — || January 16, 1998 || Oizumi || T. Kobayashi || NYS || align=right | 2.9 km || 
|-id=871 bgcolor=#fefefe
| 16871 || 1998 BD || — || January 16, 1998 || Oizumi || T. Kobayashi || FLO || align=right | 3.1 km || 
|-id=872 bgcolor=#fefefe
| 16872 || 1998 BZ || — || January 19, 1998 || Oizumi || T. Kobayashi || — || align=right | 3.8 km || 
|-id=873 bgcolor=#fefefe
| 16873 ||  || — || January 19, 1998 || Oizumi || T. Kobayashi || — || align=right | 3.5 km || 
|-id=874 bgcolor=#fefefe
| 16874 Kurtwahl ||  ||  || January 20, 1998 || Socorro || LINEAR || — || align=right | 2.5 km || 
|-id=875 bgcolor=#E9E9E9
| 16875 ||  || — || January 20, 1998 || Nachi-Katsuura || Y. Shimizu, T. Urata || EUN || align=right | 3.6 km || 
|-id=876 bgcolor=#d6d6d6
| 16876 ||  || — || January 24, 1998 || Oizumi || T. Kobayashi || VER || align=right | 11 km || 
|-id=877 bgcolor=#d6d6d6
| 16877 ||  || — || January 24, 1998 || Oizumi || T. Kobayashi || THM || align=right | 9.2 km || 
|-id=878 bgcolor=#E9E9E9
| 16878 Tombickler ||  ||  || January 24, 1998 || Haleakala || NEAT || ADE || align=right | 15 km || 
|-id=879 bgcolor=#E9E9E9
| 16879 Campai ||  ||  || January 24, 1998 || San Marcello || A. Boattini, M. Tombelli || WITslow || align=right | 5.7 km || 
|-id=880 bgcolor=#fefefe
| 16880 ||  || — || January 23, 1998 || Socorro || LINEAR || NYS || align=right | 3.9 km || 
|-id=881 bgcolor=#E9E9E9
| 16881 ||  || — || January 23, 1998 || Socorro || LINEAR || MAR || align=right | 3.5 km || 
|-id=882 bgcolor=#d6d6d6
| 16882 ||  || — || January 24, 1998 || Socorro || LINEAR || 2:1J || align=right | 9.8 km || 
|-id=883 bgcolor=#E9E9E9
| 16883 ||  || — || January 22, 1998 || Kitt Peak || Spacewatch || — || align=right | 7.8 km || 
|-id=884 bgcolor=#E9E9E9
| 16884 ||  || — || January 28, 1998 || Oizumi || T. Kobayashi || AGN || align=right | 4.7 km || 
|-id=885 bgcolor=#d6d6d6
| 16885 ||  || — || January 25, 1998 || Nachi-Katsuura || Y. Shimizu, T. Urata || — || align=right | 16 km || 
|-id=886 bgcolor=#fefefe
| 16886 ||  || — || January 29, 1998 || Oizumi || T. Kobayashi || — || align=right | 6.1 km || 
|-id=887 bgcolor=#d6d6d6
| 16887 Blouke ||  ||  || January 28, 1998 || Caussols || ODAS || EOS || align=right | 5.4 km || 
|-id=888 bgcolor=#E9E9E9
| 16888 Michaelbarber ||  ||  || January 29, 1998 || Farra d'Isonzo || Farra d'Isonzo || EUN || align=right | 4.2 km || 
|-id=889 bgcolor=#d6d6d6
| 16889 ||  || — || January 22, 1998 || Kitt Peak || Spacewatch || THM || align=right | 6.6 km || 
|-id=890 bgcolor=#E9E9E9
| 16890 ||  || — || January 29, 1998 || Uenohara || N. Kawasato || MAR || align=right | 4.2 km || 
|-id=891 bgcolor=#E9E9E9
| 16891 ||  || — || January 24, 1998 || Haleakala || NEAT || — || align=right | 11 km || 
|-id=892 bgcolor=#d6d6d6
| 16892 Vaissière ||  ||  || February 17, 1998 || Bédoin || P. Antonini || THM || align=right | 11 km || 
|-id=893 bgcolor=#d6d6d6
| 16893 ||  || — || February 22, 1998 || Haleakala || NEAT || EOS || align=right | 10 km || 
|-id=894 bgcolor=#d6d6d6
| 16894 ||  || — || February 22, 1998 || Haleakala || NEAT || EOS || align=right | 8.7 km || 
|-id=895 bgcolor=#d6d6d6
| 16895 ||  || — || February 22, 1998 || Haleakala || NEAT || EOS || align=right | 10 km || 
|-id=896 bgcolor=#fefefe
| 16896 ||  || — || February 20, 1998 || Xinglong || SCAP || PHOslow || align=right | 5.6 km || 
|-id=897 bgcolor=#d6d6d6
| 16897 ||  || — || February 22, 1998 || Haleakala || NEAT || EMA || align=right | 14 km || 
|-id=898 bgcolor=#d6d6d6
| 16898 ||  || — || February 22, 1998 || Haleakala || NEAT || — || align=right | 5.7 km || 
|-id=899 bgcolor=#E9E9E9
| 16899 ||  || — || February 22, 1998 || Haleakala || NEAT || GEF || align=right | 5.0 km || 
|-id=900 bgcolor=#d6d6d6
| 16900 Lozère ||  ||  || February 27, 1998 || Pises || Pises Obs. || THM || align=right | 10 km || 
|}

16901–17000 

|-bgcolor=#E9E9E9
| 16901 Johnbrooks ||  ||  || February 23, 1998 || Farra d'Isonzo || Farra d'Isonzo || — || align=right | 5.5 km || 
|-id=902 bgcolor=#E9E9E9
| 16902 ||  || — || February 22, 1998 || Haleakala || NEAT || — || align=right | 4.3 km || 
|-id=903 bgcolor=#E9E9E9
| 16903 ||  || — || February 22, 1998 || Haleakala || NEAT || MIT || align=right | 7.8 km || 
|-id=904 bgcolor=#d6d6d6
| 16904 ||  || — || February 22, 1998 || Haleakala || NEAT || — || align=right | 9.3 km || 
|-id=905 bgcolor=#d6d6d6
| 16905 ||  || — || February 22, 1998 || Kitt Peak || Spacewatch || — || align=right | 9.7 km || 
|-id=906 bgcolor=#d6d6d6
| 16906 Giovannisilva ||  ||  || February 18, 1998 || Bologna || San Vittore Obs. || EOS || align=right | 4.0 km || 
|-id=907 bgcolor=#d6d6d6
| 16907 ||  || — || February 28, 1998 || Kitt Peak || Spacewatch || EOS || align=right | 9.9 km || 
|-id=908 bgcolor=#fefefe
| 16908 Groeselenberg ||  ||  || February 17, 1998 || Uccle || E. W. Elst, T. Pauwels || — || align=right | 4.1 km || 
|-id=909 bgcolor=#d6d6d6
| 16909 Miladejager ||  ||  || February 27, 1998 || La Silla || E. W. Elst || KOR || align=right | 6.9 km || 
|-id=910 bgcolor=#d6d6d6
| 16910 ||  || — || February 27, 1998 || La Silla || E. W. Elst || — || align=right | 11 km || 
|-id=911 bgcolor=#d6d6d6
| 16911 ||  || — || March 1, 1998 || Caussols || ODAS || — || align=right | 5.5 km || 
|-id=912 bgcolor=#FFC2E0
| 16912 Rhiannon ||  ||  || March 2, 1998 || Caussols || ODAS || AMO +1km || align=right data-sort-value="0.93" | 930 m || 
|-id=913 bgcolor=#fefefe
| 16913 ||  || — || March 11, 1998 || Xinglong || SCAP || — || align=right | 12 km || 
|-id=914 bgcolor=#d6d6d6
| 16914 ||  || — || March 1, 1998 || La Silla || E. W. Elst || EOS || align=right | 7.2 km || 
|-id=915 bgcolor=#d6d6d6
| 16915 Bredthauer ||  ||  || March 24, 1998 || Caussols || ODAS || HIL3:2 || align=right | 14 km || 
|-id=916 bgcolor=#E9E9E9
| 16916 ||  || — || March 27, 1998 || Woomera || F. B. Zoltowski || — || align=right | 11 km || 
|-id=917 bgcolor=#d6d6d6
| 16917 ||  || — || March 20, 1998 || Socorro || LINEAR || KORslow || align=right | 6.8 km || 
|-id=918 bgcolor=#d6d6d6
| 16918 ||  || — || March 20, 1998 || Socorro || LINEAR || 7:4 || align=right | 9.9 km || 
|-id=919 bgcolor=#d6d6d6
| 16919 ||  || — || March 20, 1998 || Socorro || LINEAR || — || align=right | 9.9 km || 
|-id=920 bgcolor=#E9E9E9
| 16920 Larrywalker ||  ||  || March 20, 1998 || Socorro || LINEAR || PAD || align=right | 7.0 km || 
|-id=921 bgcolor=#d6d6d6
| 16921 ||  || — || March 20, 1998 || Socorro || LINEAR || — || align=right | 14 km || 
|-id=922 bgcolor=#d6d6d6
| 16922 ||  || — || March 20, 1998 || Socorro || LINEAR || HYG || align=right | 14 km || 
|-id=923 bgcolor=#d6d6d6
| 16923 ||  || — || March 20, 1998 || Socorro || LINEAR || THM || align=right | 11 km || 
|-id=924 bgcolor=#d6d6d6
| 16924 ||  || — || March 20, 1998 || Socorro || LINEAR || EOS || align=right | 12 km || 
|-id=925 bgcolor=#d6d6d6
| 16925 ||  || — || March 20, 1998 || Socorro || LINEAR || — || align=right | 4.6 km || 
|-id=926 bgcolor=#d6d6d6
| 16926 ||  || — || March 20, 1998 || Socorro || LINEAR || KOR || align=right | 5.9 km || 
|-id=927 bgcolor=#d6d6d6
| 16927 ||  || — || March 20, 1998 || Socorro || LINEAR || 3:2 || align=right | 23 km || 
|-id=928 bgcolor=#d6d6d6
| 16928 ||  || — || March 20, 1998 || Socorro || LINEAR || — || align=right | 13 km || 
|-id=929 bgcolor=#d6d6d6
| 16929 Hurník ||  ||  || March 31, 1998 || Ondřejov || P. Pravec || — || align=right | 9.5 km || 
|-id=930 bgcolor=#d6d6d6
| 16930 Respighi ||  ||  || March 29, 1998 || Bologna || San Vittore Obs. || — || align=right | 11 km || 
|-id=931 bgcolor=#d6d6d6
| 16931 ||  || — || March 24, 1998 || Socorro || LINEAR || — || align=right | 11 km || 
|-id=932 bgcolor=#E9E9E9
| 16932 ||  || — || March 24, 1998 || Socorro || LINEAR || — || align=right | 5.9 km || 
|-id=933 bgcolor=#d6d6d6
| 16933 ||  || — || March 24, 1998 || Socorro || LINEAR || EOS || align=right | 7.5 km || 
|-id=934 bgcolor=#d6d6d6
| 16934 ||  || — || March 24, 1998 || Socorro || LINEAR || — || align=right | 6.3 km || 
|-id=935 bgcolor=#d6d6d6
| 16935 ||  || — || March 31, 1998 || Socorro || LINEAR || EOS || align=right | 10 km || 
|-id=936 bgcolor=#d6d6d6
| 16936 ||  || — || March 31, 1998 || Socorro || LINEAR || EOS || align=right | 10 km || 
|-id=937 bgcolor=#d6d6d6
| 16937 ||  || — || March 31, 1998 || Socorro || LINEAR || EOS || align=right | 9.7 km || 
|-id=938 bgcolor=#E9E9E9
| 16938 ||  || — || March 20, 1998 || Socorro || LINEAR || GEF || align=right | 5.4 km || 
|-id=939 bgcolor=#E9E9E9
| 16939 ||  || — || March 20, 1998 || Socorro || LINEAR || — || align=right | 9.9 km || 
|-id=940 bgcolor=#E9E9E9
| 16940 ||  || — || April 2, 1998 || Socorro || LINEAR || EUN || align=right | 5.7 km || 
|-id=941 bgcolor=#E9E9E9
| 16941 ||  || — || April 2, 1998 || Socorro || LINEAR || — || align=right | 19 km || 
|-id=942 bgcolor=#d6d6d6
| 16942 ||  || — || April 20, 1998 || Socorro || LINEAR || — || align=right | 18 km || 
|-id=943 bgcolor=#E9E9E9
| 16943 ||  || — || April 23, 1998 || Haleakala || NEAT || — || align=right | 8.1 km || 
|-id=944 bgcolor=#fefefe
| 16944 Wangler ||  ||  || April 20, 1998 || Socorro || LINEAR || — || align=right | 6.8 km || 
|-id=945 bgcolor=#d6d6d6
| 16945 ||  || — || April 20, 1998 || Socorro || LINEAR || THM || align=right | 12 km || 
|-id=946 bgcolor=#fefefe
| 16946 Farnham ||  ||  || April 25, 1998 || Anderson Mesa || LONEOS || V || align=right | 3.4 km || 
|-id=947 bgcolor=#fefefe
| 16947 Wikrent ||  ||  || April 21, 1998 || Socorro || LINEAR || — || align=right | 2.5 km || 
|-id=948 bgcolor=#d6d6d6
| 16948 ||  || — || April 19, 1998 || Socorro || LINEAR || URS || align=right | 13 km || 
|-id=949 bgcolor=#d6d6d6
| 16949 ||  || — || April 19, 1998 || Socorro || LINEAR || EOS || align=right | 6.5 km || 
|-id=950 bgcolor=#fefefe
| 16950 || 1998 JQ || — || May 1, 1998 || Haleakala || NEAT || V || align=right | 3.1 km || 
|-id=951 bgcolor=#d6d6d6
| 16951 Carolus Quartus || 1998 KJ ||  || May 19, 1998 || Ondřejov || P. Pravec || EOS || align=right | 9.6 km || 
|-id=952 bgcolor=#d6d6d6
| 16952 Peteschultz ||  ||  || May 22, 1998 || Anderson Mesa || LONEOS || — || align=right | 9.0 km || 
|-id=953 bgcolor=#d6d6d6
| 16953 Besicovitch ||  ||  || May 27, 1998 || Prescott || P. G. Comba || — || align=right | 17 km || 
|-id=954 bgcolor=#E9E9E9
| 16954 ||  || — || May 22, 1998 || Socorro || LINEAR || EUN || align=right | 5.3 km || 
|-id=955 bgcolor=#fefefe
| 16955 ||  || — || May 23, 1998 || Socorro || LINEAR || — || align=right | 12 km || 
|-id=956 bgcolor=#C2FFFF
| 16956 ||  || — || June 19, 1998 || Socorro || LINEAR || L5 || align=right | 39 km || 
|-id=957 bgcolor=#fefefe
| 16957 ||  || — || July 26, 1998 || La Silla || E. W. Elst || — || align=right | 4.1 km || 
|-id=958 bgcolor=#FA8072
| 16958 Klaasen || 1998 PF ||  || August 2, 1998 || Anderson Mesa || LONEOS || — || align=right | 3.1 km || 
|-id=959 bgcolor=#E9E9E9
| 16959 ||  || — || August 17, 1998 || Socorro || LINEAR || — || align=right | 9.2 km || 
|-id=960 bgcolor=#FFC2E0
| 16960 ||  || — || August 25, 1998 || Socorro || LINEAR || APO +1kmPHA || align=right | 4.7 km || 
|-id=961 bgcolor=#E9E9E9
| 16961 ||  || — || August 24, 1998 || Socorro || LINEAR || — || align=right | 5.8 km || 
|-id=962 bgcolor=#fefefe
| 16962 Elizawoolard ||  ||  || August 28, 1998 || Socorro || LINEAR || V || align=right | 3.3 km || 
|-id=963 bgcolor=#d6d6d6
| 16963 ||  || — || September 12, 1998 || Woomera || F. B. Zoltowski || EOS || align=right | 8.6 km || 
|-id=964 bgcolor=#E9E9E9
| 16964 ||  || — || September 14, 1998 || Socorro || LINEAR || — || align=right | 9.8 km || 
|-id=965 bgcolor=#E9E9E9
| 16965 ||  || — || September 14, 1998 || Socorro || LINEAR || — || align=right | 5.4 km || 
|-id=966 bgcolor=#fefefe
| 16966 ||  || — || September 29, 1998 || Xinglong || SCAP || V || align=right | 3.6 km || 
|-id=967 bgcolor=#fefefe
| 16967 Marcosbosso ||  ||  || September 26, 1998 || Socorro || LINEAR || FLO || align=right | 3.3 km || 
|-id=968 bgcolor=#d6d6d6
| 16968 ||  || — || October 13, 1998 || Višnjan Observatory || K. Korlević || — || align=right | 15 km || 
|-id=969 bgcolor=#d6d6d6
| 16969 Helamuda ||  ||  || October 29, 1998 || Starkenburg Observatory || Starkenburg Obs. || THM || align=right | 8.3 km || 
|-id=970 bgcolor=#d6d6d6
| 16970 ||  || — || November 10, 1998 || Caussols || ODAS || 3:2 || align=right | 25 km || 
|-id=971 bgcolor=#E9E9E9
| 16971 ||  || — || November 19, 1998 || Oizumi || T. Kobayashi || EUN || align=right | 7.7 km || 
|-id=972 bgcolor=#E9E9E9
| 16972 Neish ||  ||  || November 21, 1998 || Socorro || LINEAR || — || align=right | 5.0 km || 
|-id=973 bgcolor=#fefefe
| 16973 Gaspari ||  ||  || November 23, 1998 || Socorro || LINEAR || FLO || align=right | 3.9 km || 
|-id=974 bgcolor=#C2FFFF
| 16974 Iphthime ||  ||  || November 18, 1998 || Socorro || LINEAR || L4moon || align=right | 57 km || 
|-id=975 bgcolor=#fefefe
| 16975 Delamere ||  ||  || December 27, 1998 || Anderson Mesa || LONEOS || CHL || align=right | 7.5 km || 
|-id=976 bgcolor=#fefefe
| 16976 ||  || — || January 6, 1999 || Višnjan Observatory || K. Korlević || NYS || align=right | 4.1 km || 
|-id=977 bgcolor=#fefefe
| 16977 ||  || — || January 10, 1999 || Oizumi || T. Kobayashi || V || align=right | 4.1 km || 
|-id=978 bgcolor=#fefefe
| 16978 ||  || — || January 11, 1999 || Oizumi || T. Kobayashi || PHO || align=right | 3.8 km || 
|-id=979 bgcolor=#E9E9E9
| 16979 ||  || — || January 11, 1999 || Oizumi || T. Kobayashi || — || align=right | 7.8 km || 
|-id=980 bgcolor=#fefefe
| 16980 ||  || — || January 12, 1999 || Oizumi || T. Kobayashi || FLO || align=right | 3.5 km || 
|-id=981 bgcolor=#fefefe
| 16981 ||  || — || January 11, 1999 || Gekko || T. Kagawa || — || align=right | 3.3 km || 
|-id=982 bgcolor=#fefefe
| 16982 Tsinghua ||  ||  || January 10, 1999 || Xinglong || SCAP || — || align=right | 3.2 km || 
|-id=983 bgcolor=#fefefe
| 16983 ||  || — || January 14, 1999 || Višnjan Observatory || K. Korlević || MAS || align=right | 2.8 km || 
|-id=984 bgcolor=#fefefe
| 16984 Veillet ||  ||  || January 15, 1999 || Caussols || ODAS || FLO || align=right | 2.3 km || 
|-id=985 bgcolor=#fefefe
| 16985 ||  || — || January 11, 1999 || Kitt Peak || Spacewatch || — || align=right | 3.3 km || 
|-id=986 bgcolor=#fefefe
| 16986 Archivestef ||  ||  || January 15, 1999 || Anderson Mesa || LONEOS || — || align=right | 3.8 km || 
|-id=987 bgcolor=#fefefe
| 16987 ||  || — || January 25, 1999 || Višnjan Observatory || K. Korlević || — || align=right | 3.0 km || 
|-id=988 bgcolor=#d6d6d6
| 16988 ||  || — || January 23, 1999 || Caussols || ODAS || HYG || align=right | 9.7 km || 
|-id=989 bgcolor=#fefefe
| 16989 || 1999 CX || — || February 5, 1999 || Oizumi || T. Kobayashi || — || align=right | 3.3 km || 
|-id=990 bgcolor=#fefefe
| 16990 ||  || — || February 7, 1999 || Oizumi || T. Kobayashi || FLO || align=right | 3.6 km || 
|-id=991 bgcolor=#fefefe
| 16991 ||  || — || February 12, 1999 || Višnjan Observatory || K. Korlević || — || align=right | 2.8 km || 
|-id=992 bgcolor=#E9E9E9
| 16992 ||  || — || February 12, 1999 || Oizumi || T. Kobayashi || — || align=right | 4.5 km || 
|-id=993 bgcolor=#fefefe
| 16993 ||  || — || February 15, 1999 || High Point || D. K. Chesney || — || align=right | 5.0 km || 
|-id=994 bgcolor=#d6d6d6
| 16994 ||  || — || February 13, 1999 || Višnjan Observatory || K. Korlević || — || align=right | 8.3 km || 
|-id=995 bgcolor=#fefefe
| 16995 ||  || — || February 15, 1999 || Višnjan Observatory || K. Korlević || — || align=right | 4.2 km || 
|-id=996 bgcolor=#fefefe
| 16996 Dahir ||  ||  || February 10, 1999 || Socorro || LINEAR || FLO || align=right | 3.4 km || 
|-id=997 bgcolor=#fefefe
| 16997 Garrone ||  ||  || February 10, 1999 || Socorro || LINEAR || — || align=right | 3.6 km || 
|-id=998 bgcolor=#fefefe
| 16998 Estelleweber ||  ||  || February 10, 1999 || Socorro || LINEAR || — || align=right | 3.5 km || 
|-id=999 bgcolor=#fefefe
| 16999 Ajstewart ||  ||  || February 10, 1999 || Socorro || LINEAR || NYS || align=right | 4.8 km || 
|-id=000 bgcolor=#fefefe
| 17000 Medvedev ||  ||  || February 10, 1999 || Socorro || LINEAR || FLO || align=right | 3.8 km || 
|}

References

External links 
 Discovery Circumstances: Numbered Minor Planets (15001)–(20000) (IAU Minor Planet Center)

0016